

21001–21100 

|-bgcolor=#FA8072
| 21001 Trogrlic || 1987 GF ||  || April 1, 1987 || Palomar || A. Maury || — || align=right | 2.6 km || 
|-id=002 bgcolor=#E9E9E9
| 21002 ||  || — || August 29, 1987 || La Silla || E. W. Elst || RAFslow || align=right | 3.6 km || 
|-id=003 bgcolor=#E9E9E9
| 21003 ||  || — || December 17, 1987 || La Silla || E. W. Elst, G. Pizarro || EUN || align=right | 3.9 km || 
|-id=004 bgcolor=#E9E9E9
| 21004 ||  || — || January 22, 1988 || La Silla || H. Debehogne || — || align=right | 3.6 km || 
|-id=005 bgcolor=#E9E9E9
| 21005 ||  || — || January 28, 1988 || Siding Spring || R. H. McNaught || ADE || align=right | 8.2 km || 
|-id=006 bgcolor=#E9E9E9
| 21006 ||  || — || February 17, 1988 || La Silla || E. W. Elst || — || align=right | 3.1 km || 
|-id=007 bgcolor=#fefefe
| 21007 ||  || — || March 19, 1988 || La Silla || W. Ferreri || FLO || align=right | 3.4 km || 
|-id=008 bgcolor=#fefefe
| 21008 || 1988 PE || — || August 9, 1988 || Palomar || E. F. Helin || — || align=right | 4.0 km || 
|-id=009 bgcolor=#fefefe
| 21009 Agilkia ||  ||  || August 12, 1988 || Haute Provence || E. W. Elst || NYS || align=right | 2.8 km || 
|-id=010 bgcolor=#fefefe
| 21010 Kishon ||  ||  || August 13, 1988 || Tautenburg Observatory || F. Börngen || — || align=right | 2.6 km || 
|-id=011 bgcolor=#fefefe
| 21011 ||  || — || September 1, 1988 || La Silla || H. Debehogne || — || align=right | 4.1 km || 
|-id=012 bgcolor=#d6d6d6
| 21012 ||  || — || September 8, 1988 || La Silla || H. Debehogne || — || align=right | 6.2 km || 
|-id=013 bgcolor=#d6d6d6
| 21013 ||  || — || September 14, 1988 || Cerro Tololo || S. J. Bus || THM || align=right | 6.0 km || 
|-id=014 bgcolor=#d6d6d6
| 21014 Daishi ||  ||  || October 13, 1988 || Geisei || T. Seki || THM || align=right | 7.7 km || 
|-id=015 bgcolor=#d6d6d6
| 21015 Shigenari || 1988 UF ||  || October 16, 1988 || Kitami || T. Fujii, K. Watanabe || EOS || align=right | 9.1 km || 
|-id=016 bgcolor=#fefefe
| 21016 Miyazawaseiroku || 1988 VA ||  || November 2, 1988 || Geisei || T. Seki || — || align=right | 3.4 km || 
|-id=017 bgcolor=#E9E9E9
| 21017 || 1988 VP || — || November 3, 1988 || Yorii || M. Arai, H. Mori || — || align=right | 6.7 km || 
|-id=018 bgcolor=#d6d6d6
| 21018 ||  || — || November 2, 1988 || Gekko || Y. Oshima || — || align=right | 15 km || 
|-id=019 bgcolor=#d6d6d6
| 21019 ||  || — || November 2, 1988 || Kushiro || S. Ueda, H. Kaneda || HYG || align=right | 11 km || 
|-id=020 bgcolor=#fefefe
| 21020 ||  || — || November 8, 1988 || Okutama || T. Hioki, N. Kawasato || — || align=right | 4.6 km || 
|-id=021 bgcolor=#d6d6d6
| 21021 ||  || — || December 7, 1988 || Gekko || Y. Oshima || — || align=right | 15 km || 
|-id=022 bgcolor=#E9E9E9
| 21022 Ike || 1989 CR ||  || February 2, 1989 || Geisei || T. Seki || — || align=right | 8.1 km || 
|-id=023 bgcolor=#E9E9E9
| 21023 || 1989 DK || — || February 28, 1989 || La Silla || H. Debehogne || — || align=right | 7.3 km || 
|-id=024 bgcolor=#E9E9E9
| 21024 ||  || — || April 3, 1989 || La Silla || E. W. Elst || — || align=right | 4.3 km || 
|-id=025 bgcolor=#fefefe
| 21025 ||  || — || September 26, 1989 || La Silla || E. W. Elst || FLO || align=right | 2.1 km || 
|-id=026 bgcolor=#fefefe
| 21026 ||  || — || September 26, 1989 || La Silla || E. W. Elst || — || align=right | 1.6 km || 
|-id=027 bgcolor=#d6d6d6
| 21027 ||  || — || September 28, 1989 || La Silla || E. W. Elst || KOR || align=right | 4.6 km || 
|-id=028 bgcolor=#FA8072
| 21028 || 1989 TO || — || October 4, 1989 || Palomar || E. F. Helin || PHO || align=right | 5.7 km || 
|-id=029 bgcolor=#d6d6d6
| 21029 Adorno ||  ||  || October 7, 1989 || La Silla || E. W. Elst || — || align=right | 4.5 km || 
|-id=030 bgcolor=#FA8072
| 21030 ||  || — || October 2, 1989 || Cerro Tololo || S. J. Bus || — || align=right | 3.0 km || 
|-id=031 bgcolor=#fefefe
| 21031 ||  || — || October 3, 1989 || La Silla || H. Debehogne || — || align=right | 1.8 km || 
|-id=032 bgcolor=#fefefe
| 21032 ||  || — || October 4, 1989 || La Silla || H. Debehogne || — || align=right | 2.9 km || 
|-id=033 bgcolor=#fefefe
| 21033 Akahirakiyozo || 1989 UM ||  || October 21, 1989 || Kitami || K. Endate, K. Watanabe || NYS || align=right | 3.1 km || 
|-id=034 bgcolor=#d6d6d6
| 21034 ||  || — || November 25, 1989 || Gekko || Y. Oshima || — || align=right | 10 km || 
|-id=035 bgcolor=#fefefe
| 21035 Iwabu || 1990 AE ||  || January 1, 1990 || Kitami || K. Endate, K. Watanabe || — || align=right | 3.4 km || 
|-id=036 bgcolor=#d6d6d6
| 21036 Nakamurayoshi ||  ||  || January 30, 1990 || Kushiro || M. Matsuyama, K. Watanabe || — || align=right | 13 km || 
|-id=037 bgcolor=#fefefe
| 21037 || 1990 EB || — || March 4, 1990 || Dynic || A. Sugie || — || align=right | 5.9 km || 
|-id=038 bgcolor=#d6d6d6
| 21038 ||  || — || March 2, 1990 || La Silla || E. W. Elst || — || align=right | 12 km || 
|-id=039 bgcolor=#fefefe
| 21039 ||  || — || March 2, 1990 || La Silla || E. W. Elst || NYS || align=right | 2.4 km || 
|-id=040 bgcolor=#E9E9E9
| 21040 || 1990 OZ || — || July 20, 1990 || Palomar || E. F. Helin || EUN || align=right | 4.5 km || 
|-id=041 bgcolor=#d6d6d6
| 21041 ||  || — || August 22, 1990 || Palomar || H. E. Holt || EOS || align=right | 9.1 km || 
|-id=042 bgcolor=#d6d6d6
| 21042 ||  || — || August 16, 1990 || La Silla || E. W. Elst || — || align=right | 9.6 km || 
|-id=043 bgcolor=#E9E9E9
| 21043 ||  || — || September 15, 1990 || Palomar || H. E. Holt || — || align=right | 5.6 km || 
|-id=044 bgcolor=#E9E9E9
| 21044 ||  || — || September 16, 1990 || Palomar || H. E. Holt || EUN || align=right | 3.8 km || 
|-id=045 bgcolor=#E9E9E9
| 21045 ||  || — || September 18, 1990 || Palomar || H. E. Holt || ADE || align=right | 8.2 km || 
|-id=046 bgcolor=#d6d6d6
| 21046 ||  || — || September 18, 1990 || Palomar || H. E. Holt || — || align=right | 8.6 km || 
|-id=047 bgcolor=#d6d6d6
| 21047 Hodierna ||  ||  || September 22, 1990 || La Silla || E. W. Elst || 3:2 || align=right | 16 km || 
|-id=048 bgcolor=#fefefe
| 21048 ||  || — || September 22, 1990 || La Silla || E. W. Elst || — || align=right | 1.8 km || 
|-id=049 bgcolor=#fefefe
| 21049 ||  || — || September 17, 1990 || Palomar || H. E. Holt || — || align=right | 5.4 km || 
|-id=050 bgcolor=#E9E9E9
| 21050 Beck ||  ||  || October 10, 1990 || Tautenburg Observatory || L. D. Schmadel, F. Börngen || — || align=right | 3.5 km || 
|-id=051 bgcolor=#E9E9E9
| 21051 || 1990 UM || — || October 20, 1990 || Oohira || T. Urata || — || align=right | 7.0 km || 
|-id=052 bgcolor=#E9E9E9
| 21052 ||  || — || October 16, 1990 || La Silla || E. W. Elst || GEF || align=right | 2.8 km || 
|-id=053 bgcolor=#E9E9E9
| 21053 || 1990 VE || — || November 10, 1990 || Yakiimo || A. Natori, T. Urata || — || align=right | 5.5 km || 
|-id=054 bgcolor=#d6d6d6
| 21054 Ojmjakon ||  ||  || November 15, 1990 || La Silla || E. W. Elst || EOS || align=right | 11 km || 
|-id=055 bgcolor=#E9E9E9
| 21055 || 1990 YR || — || December 23, 1990 || Okutama || T. Hioki, S. Hayakawa || — || align=right | 8.3 km || 
|-id=056 bgcolor=#FA8072
| 21056 ||  || — || February 14, 1991 || Palomar || E. F. Helin || H || align=right | 3.2 km || 
|-id=057 bgcolor=#fefefe
| 21057 Garikisraelian ||  ||  || April 8, 1991 || La Silla || E. W. Elst || V || align=right | 1.8 km || 
|-id=058 bgcolor=#fefefe
| 21058 ||  || — || April 10, 1991 || La Silla || E. W. Elst || FLO || align=right | 2.1 km || 
|-id=059 bgcolor=#d6d6d6
| 21059 Penderecki ||  ||  || April 9, 1991 || Tautenburg Observatory || F. Börngen || EOS || align=right | 5.8 km || 
|-id=060 bgcolor=#fefefe
| 21060 || 1991 JC || — || May 2, 1991 || Oohira || T. Urata || NYS || align=right | 2.9 km || 
|-id=061 bgcolor=#fefefe
| 21061 || 1991 JD || — || May 3, 1991 || Oohira || T. Urata || NYS || align=right | 3.2 km || 
|-id=062 bgcolor=#d6d6d6
| 21062 Iasky ||  ||  || May 13, 1991 || Palomar || C. S. Shoemaker, E. M. Shoemaker || — || align=right | 19 km || 
|-id=063 bgcolor=#fefefe
| 21063 ||  || — || May 8, 1991 || Siding Spring || R. H. McNaught || — || align=right | 2.5 km || 
|-id=064 bgcolor=#d6d6d6
| 21064 Yangliwei ||  ||  || June 6, 1991 || La Silla || E. W. Elst || THM || align=right | 7.5 km || 
|-id=065 bgcolor=#d6d6d6
| 21065 Jamesmelka || 1991 NM ||  || July 10, 1991 || Palomar || E. F. Helin || — || align=right | 15 km || 
|-id=066 bgcolor=#fefefe
| 21066 ||  || — || July 10, 1991 || La Silla || H. Debehogne || ERI || align=right | 6.6 km || 
|-id=067 bgcolor=#fefefe
| 21067 ||  || — || August 2, 1991 || La Silla || E. W. Elst || Vfast? || align=right | 2.2 km || 
|-id=068 bgcolor=#fefefe
| 21068 ||  || — || August 2, 1991 || La Silla || E. W. Elst || — || align=right | 2.8 km || 
|-id=069 bgcolor=#E9E9E9
| 21069 ||  || — || August 3, 1991 || La Silla || E. W. Elst || — || align=right | 3.3 km || 
|-id=070 bgcolor=#E9E9E9
| 21070 ||  || — || August 6, 1991 || La Silla || E. W. Elst || — || align=right | 2.5 km || 
|-id=071 bgcolor=#E9E9E9
| 21071 ||  || — || August 6, 1991 || La Silla || E. W. Elst || — || align=right | 4.5 km || 
|-id=072 bgcolor=#E9E9E9
| 21072 ||  || — || August 5, 1991 || Palomar || H. E. Holt || RAF || align=right | 3.2 km || 
|-id=073 bgcolor=#E9E9E9
| 21073 Darksky || 1991 RE ||  || September 4, 1991 || Siding Spring || R. H. McNaught || — || align=right | 2.9 km || 
|-id=074 bgcolor=#fefefe
| 21074 Rügen ||  ||  || September 12, 1991 || Tautenburg Observatory || F. Börngen, L. D. Schmadel || — || align=right | 4.3 km || 
|-id=075 bgcolor=#fefefe
| 21075 Heussinger ||  ||  || September 12, 1991 || Tautenburg Observatory || L. D. Schmadel, F. Börngen || NYS || align=right | 4.6 km || 
|-id=076 bgcolor=#fefefe
| 21076 Kokoschka ||  ||  || September 12, 1991 || Tautenburg Observatory || F. Börngen, L. D. Schmadel || NYS || align=right | 1.8 km || 
|-id=077 bgcolor=#E9E9E9
| 21077 ||  || — || September 13, 1991 || Palomar || H. E. Holt || EUN || align=right | 4.0 km || 
|-id=078 bgcolor=#d6d6d6
| 21078 ||  || — || September 15, 1991 || Palomar || H. E. Holt || 7:4 || align=right | 15 km || 
|-id=079 bgcolor=#E9E9E9
| 21079 ||  || — || September 11, 1991 || Palomar || H. E. Holt || GEF || align=right | 6.0 km || 
|-id=080 bgcolor=#fefefe
| 21080 ||  || — || September 13, 1991 || Palomar || H. E. Holt || — || align=right | 7.4 km || 
|-id=081 bgcolor=#E9E9E9
| 21081 ||  || — || September 14, 1991 || Palomar || H. E. Holt || — || align=right | 4.9 km || 
|-id=082 bgcolor=#E9E9E9
| 21082 Araimasaru ||  ||  || October 13, 1991 || Okutama || T. Hioki, S. Hayakawa || — || align=right | 2.9 km || 
|-id=083 bgcolor=#E9E9E9
| 21083 ||  || — || October 2, 1991 || Palomar || C. P. de Saint-Aignan || — || align=right | 2.4 km || 
|-id=084 bgcolor=#E9E9E9
| 21084 ||  || — || October 31, 1991 || Kushiro || S. Ueda, H. Kaneda || — || align=right | 5.0 km || 
|-id=085 bgcolor=#E9E9E9
| 21085 ||  || — || October 18, 1991 || Kushiro || S. Ueda, H. Kaneda || VIB || align=right | 5.1 km || 
|-id=086 bgcolor=#fefefe
| 21086 ||  || — || January 10, 1992 || Okutama || T. Hioki, S. Hayakawa || — || align=right | 3.8 km || 
|-id=087 bgcolor=#E9E9E9
| 21087 Petsimpallas ||  ||  || January 30, 1992 || La Silla || E. W. Elst || EUN || align=right | 5.5 km || 
|-id=088 bgcolor=#FFC2E0
| 21088 Chelyabinsk ||  ||  || January 30, 1992 || La Silla || E. W. Elst || AMO +1km || align=right | 2.8 km || 
|-id=089 bgcolor=#E9E9E9
| 21089 Mochizuki || 1992 CQ ||  || February 8, 1992 || Geisei || T. Seki || — || align=right | 7.7 km || 
|-id=090 bgcolor=#E9E9E9
| 21090 ||  || — || February 29, 1992 || La Silla || UESAC || EUN || align=right | 4.0 km || 
|-id=091 bgcolor=#fefefe
| 21091 ||  || — || February 29, 1992 || La Silla || UESAC || FLO || align=right | 3.8 km || 
|-id=092 bgcolor=#E9E9E9
| 21092 ||  || — || March 1, 1992 || La Silla || UESAC || — || align=right | 5.6 km || 
|-id=093 bgcolor=#E9E9E9
| 21093 ||  || — || March 1, 1992 || La Silla || UESAC || — || align=right | 6.6 km || 
|-id=094 bgcolor=#E9E9E9
| 21094 ||  || — || March 1, 1992 || La Silla || UESAC || — || align=right | 3.8 km || 
|-id=095 bgcolor=#E9E9E9
| 21095 ||  || — || March 6, 1992 || La Silla || UESAC || — || align=right | 4.4 km || 
|-id=096 bgcolor=#E9E9E9
| 21096 ||  || — || March 6, 1992 || La Silla || UESAC || — || align=right | 7.4 km || 
|-id=097 bgcolor=#d6d6d6
| 21097 ||  || — || March 8, 1992 || La Silla || UESAC || — || align=right | 4.5 km || 
|-id=098 bgcolor=#d6d6d6
| 21098 ||  || — || March 2, 1992 || La Silla || UESAC || — || align=right | 6.2 km || 
|-id=099 bgcolor=#fefefe
| 21099 ||  || — || April 4, 1992 || La Silla || E. W. Elst || — || align=right | 2.9 km || 
|-id=100 bgcolor=#d6d6d6
| 21100 || 1992 OB || — || July 26, 1992 || Siding Spring || R. H. McNaught || TIR || align=right | 7.0 km || 
|}

21101–21200 

|-bgcolor=#fefefe
| 21101 ||  || — || July 26, 1992 || La Silla || H. Debehogne || PHO || align=right | 4.8 km || 
|-id=102 bgcolor=#fefefe
| 21102 ||  || — || July 26, 1992 || La Silla || E. W. Elst || — || align=right | 2.3 km || 
|-id=103 bgcolor=#fefefe
| 21103 ||  || — || July 26, 1992 || La Silla || E. W. Elst || — || align=right | 2.7 km || 
|-id=104 bgcolor=#FA8072
| 21104 Sveshnikov || 1992 PY ||  || August 8, 1992 || Caussols || E. W. Elst || PHO || align=right | 3.6 km || 
|-id=105 bgcolor=#d6d6d6
| 21105 ||  || — || August 8, 1992 || Caussols || E. W. Elst || — || align=right | 10 km || 
|-id=106 bgcolor=#fefefe
| 21106 ||  || — || August 2, 1992 || Palomar || H. E. Holt || V || align=right | 2.9 km || 
|-id=107 bgcolor=#E9E9E9
| 21107 ||  || — || August 4, 1992 || Palomar || H. E. Holt || EUN || align=right | 7.1 km || 
|-id=108 bgcolor=#fefefe
| 21108 || 1992 QT || — || August 31, 1992 || Palomar || E. F. Helin || — || align=right | 6.7 km || 
|-id=109 bgcolor=#d6d6d6
| 21109 Sünkel || 1992 RY ||  || September 4, 1992 || Tautenburg Observatory || L. D. Schmadel, F. Börngen || — || align=right | 11 km || 
|-id=110 bgcolor=#fefefe
| 21110 Karlvalentin ||  ||  || September 4, 1992 || Tautenburg Observatory || F. Börngen, L. D. Schmadel || NYS || align=right | 1.9 km || 
|-id=111 bgcolor=#fefefe
| 21111 ||  || — || September 2, 1992 || La Silla || E. W. Elst || — || align=right | 4.3 km || 
|-id=112 bgcolor=#fefefe
| 21112 ||  || — || September 2, 1992 || La Silla || E. W. Elst || FLO || align=right | 1.8 km || 
|-id=113 bgcolor=#fefefe
| 21113 ||  || — || September 2, 1992 || La Silla || E. W. Elst || — || align=right | 2.1 km || 
|-id=114 bgcolor=#fefefe
| 21114 Bernson ||  ||  || September 2, 1992 || La Silla || E. W. Elst || FLO || align=right | 1.9 km || 
|-id=115 bgcolor=#fefefe
| 21115 ||  || — || September 2, 1992 || La Silla || E. W. Elst || NYS || align=right | 2.2 km || 
|-id=116 bgcolor=#fefefe
| 21116 || 1992 SO || — || September 26, 1992 || Dynic || A. Sugie || V || align=right | 2.9 km || 
|-id=117 bgcolor=#fefefe
| 21117 Tashimaseizo ||  ||  || September 30, 1992 || Kitami || K. Endate, K. Watanabe || NYS || align=right | 3.9 km || 
|-id=118 bgcolor=#fefefe
| 21118 Hezimmermann ||  ||  || September 24, 1992 || Tautenburg Observatory || L. D. Schmadel, F. Börngen || NYS || align=right | 1.8 km || 
|-id=119 bgcolor=#E9E9E9
| 21119 || 1992 UJ || — || October 19, 1992 || Kushiro || S. Ueda, H. Kaneda || — || align=right | 5.7 km || 
|-id=120 bgcolor=#E9E9E9
| 21120 || 1992 WP || — || November 16, 1992 || Kitami || K. Endate, K. Watanabe || — || align=right | 3.8 km || 
|-id=121 bgcolor=#fefefe
| 21121 Andoshoeki || 1992 WV ||  || November 16, 1992 || Kitami || K. Endate, K. Watanabe || — || align=right | 3.6 km || 
|-id=122 bgcolor=#fefefe
| 21122 || 1992 YK || — || December 23, 1992 || Yakiimo || A. Natori, T. Urata || V || align=right | 5.6 km || 
|-id=123 bgcolor=#fefefe
| 21123 ||  || — || December 18, 1992 || Caussols || E. W. Elst || — || align=right | 2.8 km || 
|-id=124 bgcolor=#fefefe
| 21124 ||  || — || December 18, 1992 || Caussols || E. W. Elst || — || align=right | 3.5 km || 
|-id=125 bgcolor=#fefefe
| 21125 Orff ||  ||  || December 30, 1992 || Tautenburg Observatory || F. Börngen || — || align=right | 4.0 km || 
|-id=126 bgcolor=#fefefe
| 21126 Katsuyoshi ||  ||  || January 19, 1993 || Geisei || T. Seki || V || align=right | 4.3 km || 
|-id=127 bgcolor=#E9E9E9
| 21127 ||  || — || January 27, 1993 || Caussols || E. W. Elst || EUN || align=right | 4.2 km || 
|-id=128 bgcolor=#d6d6d6
| 21128 Chapuis ||  ||  || January 27, 1993 || Caussols || E. W. Elst || HIL3:2 || align=right | 18 km || 
|-id=129 bgcolor=#E9E9E9
| 21129 ||  || — || January 23, 1993 || La Silla || E. W. Elst || MAR || align=right | 5.1 km || 
|-id=130 bgcolor=#E9E9E9
| 21130 || 1993 FN || — || March 23, 1993 || Lake Tekapo || A. C. Gilmore, P. M. Kilmartin || — || align=right | 3.3 km || 
|-id=131 bgcolor=#d6d6d6
| 21131 ||  || — || March 17, 1993 || La Silla || UESAC || EOS || align=right | 4.7 km || 
|-id=132 bgcolor=#d6d6d6
| 21132 ||  || — || March 17, 1993 || La Silla || UESAC || KOR || align=right | 5.2 km || 
|-id=133 bgcolor=#E9E9E9
| 21133 ||  || — || March 17, 1993 || La Silla || UESAC || — || align=right | 3.2 km || 
|-id=134 bgcolor=#E9E9E9
| 21134 ||  || — || March 17, 1993 || La Silla || UESAC || PAD || align=right | 5.8 km || 
|-id=135 bgcolor=#E9E9E9
| 21135 ||  || — || March 17, 1993 || La Silla || UESAC || — || align=right | 3.6 km || 
|-id=136 bgcolor=#E9E9E9
| 21136 ||  || — || March 17, 1993 || La Silla || UESAC || — || align=right | 3.7 km || 
|-id=137 bgcolor=#d6d6d6
| 21137 ||  || — || March 21, 1993 || La Silla || UESAC || KOR || align=right | 4.2 km || 
|-id=138 bgcolor=#E9E9E9
| 21138 ||  || — || March 21, 1993 || La Silla || UESAC || — || align=right | 2.5 km || 
|-id=139 bgcolor=#E9E9E9
| 21139 ||  || — || March 21, 1993 || La Silla || UESAC || — || align=right | 3.0 km || 
|-id=140 bgcolor=#E9E9E9
| 21140 ||  || — || March 21, 1993 || La Silla || UESAC || — || align=right | 2.1 km || 
|-id=141 bgcolor=#E9E9E9
| 21141 ||  || — || March 21, 1993 || La Silla || UESAC || — || align=right | 5.7 km || 
|-id=142 bgcolor=#E9E9E9
| 21142 ||  || — || March 19, 1993 || La Silla || UESAC || — || align=right | 3.2 km || 
|-id=143 bgcolor=#E9E9E9
| 21143 ||  || — || March 19, 1993 || La Silla || UESAC || — || align=right | 6.2 km || 
|-id=144 bgcolor=#E9E9E9
| 21144 ||  || — || March 19, 1993 || La Silla || UESAC || — || align=right | 5.5 km || 
|-id=145 bgcolor=#E9E9E9
| 21145 ||  || — || March 19, 1993 || La Silla || UESAC || — || align=right | 3.2 km || 
|-id=146 bgcolor=#E9E9E9
| 21146 ||  || — || March 21, 1993 || La Silla || UESAC || — || align=right | 5.6 km || 
|-id=147 bgcolor=#E9E9E9
| 21147 ||  || — || March 18, 1993 || La Silla || UESAC || — || align=right | 3.8 km || 
|-id=148 bgcolor=#E9E9E9
| 21148 Billramsey ||  ||  || April 16, 1993 || Palomar || C. S. Shoemaker, E. M. Shoemaker || MIT || align=right | 9.9 km || 
|-id=149 bgcolor=#fefefe
| 21149 Kenmitchell ||  ||  || April 19, 1993 || Palomar || C. S. Shoemaker, E. M. Shoemaker || H || align=right | 3.0 km || 
|-id=150 bgcolor=#E9E9E9
| 21150 ||  || — || June 13, 1993 || Siding Spring || R. H. McNaught || EUN || align=right | 5.2 km || 
|-id=151 bgcolor=#E9E9E9
| 21151 ||  || — || June 13, 1993 || Siding Spring || R. H. McNaught || — || align=right | 3.9 km || 
|-id=152 bgcolor=#E9E9E9
| 21152 ||  || — || June 17, 1993 || Palomar || H. E. Holt || EUN || align=right | 6.3 km || 
|-id=153 bgcolor=#E9E9E9
| 21153 ||  || — || June 18, 1993 || Siding Spring || R. H. McNaught || — || align=right | 6.0 km || 
|-id=154 bgcolor=#d6d6d6
| 21154 ||  || — || July 12, 1993 || La Silla || E. W. Elst || — || align=right | 5.4 km || 
|-id=155 bgcolor=#d6d6d6
| 21155 ||  || — || July 12, 1993 || La Silla || E. W. Elst || KOR || align=right | 3.9 km || 
|-id=156 bgcolor=#fefefe
| 21156 ||  || — || August 20, 1993 || La Silla || E. W. Elst || V || align=right | 2.0 km || 
|-id=157 bgcolor=#d6d6d6
| 21157 ||  || — || September 15, 1993 || La Silla || E. W. Elst || — || align=right | 9.2 km || 
|-id=158 bgcolor=#fefefe
| 21158 ||  || — || September 15, 1993 || La Silla || H. Debehogne, E. W. Elst || — || align=right | 2.0 km || 
|-id=159 bgcolor=#fefefe
| 21159 ||  || — || September 17, 1993 || La Silla || E. W. Elst || — || align=right | 2.5 km || 
|-id=160 bgcolor=#d6d6d6
| 21160 Saveriolombardi || 1993 TJ ||  || October 10, 1993 || Stroncone || A. Vagnozzi || EOS || align=right | 8.8 km || 
|-id=161 bgcolor=#d6d6d6
| 21161 Yamashitaharuo ||  ||  || October 15, 1993 || Kitami || K. Endate, K. Watanabe || — || align=right | 19 km || 
|-id=162 bgcolor=#d6d6d6
| 21162 ||  || — || October 9, 1993 || La Silla || E. W. Elst || — || align=right | 6.4 km || 
|-id=163 bgcolor=#fefefe
| 21163 ||  || — || October 9, 1993 || La Silla || E. W. Elst || — || align=right | 2.3 km || 
|-id=164 bgcolor=#d6d6d6
| 21164 ||  || — || October 20, 1993 || La Silla || E. W. Elst || — || align=right | 17 km || 
|-id=165 bgcolor=#fefefe
| 21165 ||  || — || November 11, 1993 || Kushiro || S. Ueda, H. Kaneda || — || align=right | 2.9 km || 
|-id=166 bgcolor=#fefefe
| 21166 Nobuyukishouji || 1993 XH ||  || December 6, 1993 || Geisei || T. Seki || — || align=right | 2.4 km || 
|-id=167 bgcolor=#d6d6d6
| 21167 || 1993 XQ || — || December 9, 1993 || Oizumi || T. Kobayashi || KOR || align=right | 4.7 km || 
|-id=168 bgcolor=#fefefe
| 21168 ||  || — || January 7, 1994 || Kitt Peak || Spacewatch || — || align=right | 2.5 km || 
|-id=169 bgcolor=#fefefe
| 21169 ||  || — || January 8, 1994 || Kitt Peak || Spacewatch || NYS || align=right | 1.3 km || 
|-id=170 bgcolor=#fefefe
| 21170 ||  || — || January 8, 1994 || Kitt Peak || Spacewatch || — || align=right | 2.5 km || 
|-id=171 bgcolor=#fefefe
| 21171 ||  || — || February 7, 1994 || Oizumi || T. Kobayashi || FLO || align=right | 2.9 km || 
|-id=172 bgcolor=#fefefe
| 21172 ||  || — || February 7, 1994 || La Silla || E. W. Elst || — || align=right | 2.7 km || 
|-id=173 bgcolor=#fefefe
| 21173 ||  || — || February 7, 1994 || La Silla || E. W. Elst || — || align=right | 5.7 km || 
|-id=174 bgcolor=#fefefe
| 21174 ||  || — || February 7, 1994 || La Silla || E. W. Elst || NYS || align=right | 7.3 km || 
|-id=175 bgcolor=#fefefe
| 21175 ||  || — || February 7, 1994 || La Silla || E. W. Elst || — || align=right | 4.2 km || 
|-id=176 bgcolor=#fefefe
| 21176 ||  || — || February 8, 1994 || La Silla || E. W. Elst || NYS || align=right | 7.7 km || 
|-id=177 bgcolor=#fefefe
| 21177 ||  || — || February 8, 1994 || La Silla || E. W. Elst || NYS || align=right | 1.8 km || 
|-id=178 bgcolor=#fefefe
| 21178 ||  || — || February 8, 1994 || La Silla || E. W. Elst || V || align=right | 2.8 km || 
|-id=179 bgcolor=#fefefe
| 21179 ||  || — || February 8, 1994 || La Silla || E. W. Elst || — || align=right | 5.4 km || 
|-id=180 bgcolor=#fefefe
| 21180 || 1994 DC || — || February 16, 1994 || Oizumi || T. Kobayashi || — || align=right | 3.2 km || 
|-id=181 bgcolor=#fefefe
| 21181 ||  || — || March 6, 1994 || Palomar || E. F. Helin || PHO || align=right | 4.4 km || 
|-id=182 bgcolor=#fefefe
| 21182 Teshiogawa ||  ||  || March 12, 1994 || Kitami || K. Endate, K. Watanabe || PHO || align=right | 4.2 km || 
|-id=183 bgcolor=#FA8072
| 21183 ||  || — || March 9, 1994 || Palomar || E. F. Helin || PHO || align=right | 4.1 km || 
|-id=184 bgcolor=#fefefe
| 21184 ||  || — || March 6, 1994 || Kitt Peak || Spacewatch || — || align=right | 2.5 km || 
|-id=185 bgcolor=#fefefe
| 21185 ||  || — || March 9, 1994 || Caussols || E. W. Elst || V || align=right | 1.6 km || 
|-id=186 bgcolor=#fefefe
| 21186 ||  || — || March 9, 1994 || Caussols || E. W. Elst || — || align=right | 2.8 km || 
|-id=187 bgcolor=#fefefe
| 21187 Setsuo || 1994 FY ||  || March 31, 1994 || Kitami || K. Endate, K. Watanabe || — || align=right | 4.3 km || 
|-id=188 bgcolor=#fefefe
| 21188 Kiyohiro || 1994 GN ||  || April 5, 1994 || Kitami || K. Endate, K. Watanabe || FLO || align=right | 3.8 km || 
|-id=189 bgcolor=#E9E9E9
| 21189 Robertonesci || 1994 JB ||  || May 3, 1994 || Stroncone || A. Vagnozzi || — || align=right | 2.7 km || 
|-id=190 bgcolor=#E9E9E9
| 21190 Martamaffei || 1994 JQ ||  || May 10, 1994 || Stroncone || A. Vagnozzi || — || align=right | 2.6 km || 
|-id=191 bgcolor=#E9E9E9
| 21191 ||  || — || May 4, 1994 || Kitt Peak || Spacewatch || — || align=right | 2.4 km || 
|-id=192 bgcolor=#fefefe
| 21192 Seccisergio || 1994 NA ||  || July 2, 1994 || Stroncone || Santa Lucia Obs. || V || align=right | 2.4 km || 
|-id=193 bgcolor=#E9E9E9
| 21193 ||  || — || August 14, 1994 || Siding Spring || R. H. McNaught || — || align=right | 3.4 km || 
|-id=194 bgcolor=#E9E9E9
| 21194 ||  || — || August 11, 1994 || Siding Spring || R. H. McNaught || — || align=right | 14 km || 
|-id=195 bgcolor=#E9E9E9
| 21195 ||  || — || August 10, 1994 || La Silla || E. W. Elst || AEO || align=right | 6.5 km || 
|-id=196 bgcolor=#d6d6d6
| 21196 ||  || — || August 10, 1994 || La Silla || E. W. Elst || EOS || align=right | 3.6 km || 
|-id=197 bgcolor=#E9E9E9
| 21197 ||  || — || August 10, 1994 || La Silla || E. W. Elst || — || align=right | 4.0 km || 
|-id=198 bgcolor=#E9E9E9
| 21198 ||  || — || August 10, 1994 || La Silla || E. W. Elst || — || align=right | 5.3 km || 
|-id=199 bgcolor=#fefefe
| 21199 ||  || — || August 10, 1994 || La Silla || E. W. Elst || FLO || align=right | 2.1 km || 
|-id=200 bgcolor=#E9E9E9
| 21200 ||  || — || August 10, 1994 || La Silla || E. W. Elst || WIT || align=right | 3.0 km || 
|}

21201–21300 

|-bgcolor=#d6d6d6
| 21201 ||  || — || August 12, 1994 || La Silla || E. W. Elst || KOR || align=right | 4.4 km || 
|-id=202 bgcolor=#d6d6d6
| 21202 ||  || — || August 12, 1994 || La Silla || E. W. Elst || — || align=right | 6.9 km || 
|-id=203 bgcolor=#d6d6d6
| 21203 ||  || — || August 12, 1994 || La Silla || E. W. Elst || — || align=right | 6.1 km || 
|-id=204 bgcolor=#d6d6d6
| 21204 ||  || — || August 12, 1994 || La Silla || E. W. Elst || KOR || align=right | 5.5 km || 
|-id=205 bgcolor=#E9E9E9
| 21205 ||  || — || August 12, 1994 || La Silla || E. W. Elst || — || align=right | 4.3 km || 
|-id=206 bgcolor=#d6d6d6
| 21206 ||  || — || August 12, 1994 || La Silla || E. W. Elst || slow || align=right | 11 km || 
|-id=207 bgcolor=#E9E9E9
| 21207 ||  || — || August 12, 1994 || La Silla || E. W. Elst || slow || align=right | 4.8 km || 
|-id=208 bgcolor=#d6d6d6
| 21208 ||  || — || August 12, 1994 || La Silla || E. W. Elst || — || align=right | 7.9 km || 
|-id=209 bgcolor=#d6d6d6
| 21209 ||  || — || August 12, 1994 || La Silla || E. W. Elst || 628 || align=right | 6.5 km || 
|-id=210 bgcolor=#d6d6d6
| 21210 ||  || — || August 12, 1994 || La Silla || E. W. Elst || — || align=right | 8.8 km || 
|-id=211 bgcolor=#d6d6d6
| 21211 ||  || — || August 10, 1994 || La Silla || E. W. Elst || EOS || align=right | 5.0 km || 
|-id=212 bgcolor=#d6d6d6
| 21212 ||  || — || August 10, 1994 || La Silla || E. W. Elst || — || align=right | 5.7 km || 
|-id=213 bgcolor=#E9E9E9
| 21213 ||  || — || September 12, 1994 || Kitt Peak || Spacewatch || — || align=right | 3.2 km || 
|-id=214 bgcolor=#E9E9E9
| 21214 ||  || — || September 12, 1994 || Kitt Peak || Spacewatch || — || align=right | 3.4 km || 
|-id=215 bgcolor=#E9E9E9
| 21215 || 1994 UQ || — || October 31, 1994 || Oizumi || T. Kobayashi || EUN || align=right | 6.5 km || 
|-id=216 bgcolor=#d6d6d6
| 21216 ||  || — || October 31, 1994 || Kushiro || S. Ueda, H. Kaneda || SAN || align=right | 8.3 km || 
|-id=217 bgcolor=#d6d6d6
| 21217 ||  || — || November 4, 1994 || Oizumi || T. Kobayashi || — || align=right | 9.7 km || 
|-id=218 bgcolor=#d6d6d6
| 21218 ||  || — || November 7, 1994 || Kushiro || S. Ueda, H. Kaneda || — || align=right | 10 km || 
|-id=219 bgcolor=#d6d6d6
| 21219 Mascagni ||  ||  || November 28, 1994 || Colleverde || V. S. Casulli || THM || align=right | 9.4 km || 
|-id=220 bgcolor=#d6d6d6
| 21220 ||  || — || November 30, 1994 || Oizumi || T. Kobayashi || EOS || align=right | 8.1 km || 
|-id=221 bgcolor=#d6d6d6
| 21221 ||  || — || December 31, 1994 || Oizumi || T. Kobayashi || EOS || align=right | 7.9 km || 
|-id=222 bgcolor=#d6d6d6
| 21222 || 1995 BT || — || January 23, 1995 || Oizumi || T. Kobayashi || ALA || align=right | 12 km || 
|-id=223 bgcolor=#d6d6d6
| 21223 || 1995 DL || — || February 21, 1995 || Oizumi || T. Kobayashi || — || align=right | 11 km || 
|-id=224 bgcolor=#d6d6d6
| 21224 ||  || — || February 24, 1995 || Kitt Peak || Spacewatch || ALA || align=right | 20 km || 
|-id=225 bgcolor=#fefefe
| 21225 ||  || — || April 1, 1995 || Kitt Peak || Spacewatch || FLO || align=right | 2.1 km || 
|-id=226 bgcolor=#fefefe
| 21226 ||  || — || July 24, 1995 || Kitt Peak || Spacewatch || — || align=right | 1.8 km || 
|-id=227 bgcolor=#fefefe
| 21227 || 1995 QS || — || August 16, 1995 || Nachi-Katsuura || Y. Shimizu, T. Urata || FLO || align=right | 3.8 km || 
|-id=228 bgcolor=#FA8072
| 21228 || 1995 SC || — || September 20, 1995 || Catalina Station || T. B. Spahr || — || align=right | 5.2 km || 
|-id=229 bgcolor=#E9E9E9
| 21229 Sušil ||  ||  || September 22, 1995 || Ondřejov || L. Kotková || — || align=right | 3.9 km || 
|-id=230 bgcolor=#fefefe
| 21230 ||  || — || September 23, 1995 || Loiano || Loiano Obs. || NYS || align=right | 3.0 km || 
|-id=231 bgcolor=#E9E9E9
| 21231 ||  || — || September 18, 1995 || Kitt Peak || Spacewatch || — || align=right | 5.3 km || 
|-id=232 bgcolor=#E9E9E9
| 21232 ||  || — || September 19, 1995 || Kitt Peak || Spacewatch || — || align=right | 2.4 km || 
|-id=233 bgcolor=#E9E9E9
| 21233 ||  || — || October 20, 1995 || Oizumi || T. Kobayashi || VIB || align=right | 7.0 km || 
|-id=234 bgcolor=#E9E9E9
| 21234 Nakashima || 1995 WG ||  || November 16, 1995 || Oizumi || T. Kobayashi || EUN || align=right | 4.1 km || 
|-id=235 bgcolor=#E9E9E9
| 21235 ||  || — || November 18, 1995 || Oizumi || T. Kobayashi || — || align=right | 6.5 km || 
|-id=236 bgcolor=#E9E9E9
| 21236 Moneta ||  ||  || November 20, 1995 || Farra d'Isonzo || Farra d'Isonzo || — || align=right | 2.9 km || 
|-id=237 bgcolor=#E9E9E9
| 21237 Suematsu ||  ||  || November 18, 1995 || Kitami || K. Endate, K. Watanabe || — || align=right | 4.8 km || 
|-id=238 bgcolor=#E9E9E9
| 21238 Panarea ||  ||  || November 28, 1995 || Oizumi || T. Kobayashi || — || align=right | 5.2 km || 
|-id=239 bgcolor=#E9E9E9
| 21239 ||  || — || November 17, 1995 || Kitt Peak || Spacewatch || — || align=right | 3.0 km || 
|-id=240 bgcolor=#fefefe
| 21240 ||  || — || November 18, 1995 || Kitt Peak || Spacewatch || NYS || align=right | 2.2 km || 
|-id=241 bgcolor=#E9E9E9
| 21241 ||  || — || November 20, 1995 || Kitt Peak || Spacewatch || EUN || align=right | 4.0 km || 
|-id=242 bgcolor=#fefefe
| 21242 ||  || — || November 25, 1995 || Kushiro || S. Ueda, H. Kaneda || PHO || align=right | 5.1 km || 
|-id=243 bgcolor=#E9E9E9
| 21243 ||  || — || December 15, 1995 || Oizumi || T. Kobayashi || — || align=right | 4.3 km || 
|-id=244 bgcolor=#fefefe
| 21244 ||  || — || December 14, 1995 || Haleakala || AMOS || NYS || align=right | 3.1 km || 
|-id=245 bgcolor=#E9E9E9
| 21245 ||  || — || December 14, 1995 || Kitt Peak || Spacewatch || HOF || align=right | 6.1 km || 
|-id=246 bgcolor=#E9E9E9
| 21246 ||  || — || December 21, 1995 || Oizumi || T. Kobayashi || GEF || align=right | 6.6 km || 
|-id=247 bgcolor=#d6d6d6
| 21247 ||  || — || December 21, 1995 || Oizumi || T. Kobayashi || KOR || align=right | 4.8 km || 
|-id=248 bgcolor=#E9E9E9
| 21248 ||  || — || December 21, 1995 || Oizumi || T. Kobayashi || — || align=right | 6.3 km || 
|-id=249 bgcolor=#fefefe
| 21249 ||  || — || December 21, 1995 || Oizumi || T. Kobayashi || NYS || align=right | 2.3 km || 
|-id=250 bgcolor=#E9E9E9
| 21250 Kamikouchi ||  ||  || December 17, 1995 || Chichibu || N. Satō || — || align=right | 2.9 km || 
|-id=251 bgcolor=#E9E9E9
| 21251 ||  || — || December 31, 1995 || Oohira || T. Urata || — || align=right | 4.0 km || 
|-id=252 bgcolor=#E9E9E9
| 21252 ||  || — || December 18, 1995 || Kitt Peak || Spacewatch || — || align=right | 11 km || 
|-id=253 bgcolor=#E9E9E9
| 21253 ||  || — || January 13, 1996 || Kushiro || S. Ueda, H. Kaneda || — || align=right | 12 km || 
|-id=254 bgcolor=#E9E9E9
| 21254 Jonan ||  ||  || January 24, 1996 || KCAO || J. Kobayashi || HNS || align=right | 6.0 km || 
|-id=255 bgcolor=#E9E9E9
| 21255 ||  || — || February 15, 1996 || Haleakala || NEAT || EUN || align=right | 6.4 km || 
|-id=256 bgcolor=#d6d6d6
| 21256 Robertobattiston ||  ||  || February 14, 1996 || Cima Ekar || M. Tombelli, C. Casacci || — || align=right | 7.8 km || 
|-id=257 bgcolor=#d6d6d6
| 21257 Jižní Čechy ||  ||  || February 26, 1996 || Kleť || Kleť Obs. || NAE || align=right | 8.3 km || 
|-id=258 bgcolor=#d6d6d6
| 21258 Huckins ||  ||  || March 15, 1996 || Haleakala || NEAT || MEL || align=right | 13 km || 
|-id=259 bgcolor=#d6d6d6
| 21259 ||  || — || March 11, 1996 || Kitt Peak || Spacewatch || — || align=right | 7.2 km || 
|-id=260 bgcolor=#fefefe
| 21260 || 1996 FE || — || March 16, 1996 || Haleakala || NEAT || H || align=right | 1.6 km || 
|-id=261 bgcolor=#fefefe
| 21261 || 1996 FF || — || March 16, 1996 || Haleakala || NEAT || H || align=right | 2.6 km || 
|-id=262 bgcolor=#d6d6d6
| 21262 Kanba ||  ||  || April 24, 1996 || Yatsuka || R. H. McNaught, H. Abe || — || align=right | 13 km || 
|-id=263 bgcolor=#fefefe
| 21263 ||  || — || April 17, 1996 || La Silla || E. W. Elst || — || align=right | 2.6 km || 
|-id=264 bgcolor=#d6d6d6
| 21264 ||  || — || April 18, 1996 || La Silla || E. W. Elst || — || align=right | 7.2 km || 
|-id=265 bgcolor=#fefefe
| 21265 ||  || — || April 20, 1996 || La Silla || E. W. Elst || — || align=right | 2.8 km || 
|-id=266 bgcolor=#fefefe
| 21266 ||  || — || April 20, 1996 || La Silla || E. W. Elst || — || align=right | 2.7 km || 
|-id=267 bgcolor=#fefefe
| 21267 ||  || — || May 11, 1996 || Kitt Peak || Spacewatch || — || align=right | 2.0 km || 
|-id=268 bgcolor=#d6d6d6
| 21268 ||  || — || May 22, 1996 || Catalina Station || T. B. Spahr || — || align=right | 9.7 km || 
|-id=269 bgcolor=#fefefe
| 21269 Bechini || 1996 LG ||  || June 6, 1996 || San Marcello || L. Tesi, A. Boattini || — || align=right | 3.3 km || 
|-id=270 bgcolor=#fefefe
| 21270 Otokar || 1996 OK ||  || July 19, 1996 || Kleť || J. Tichá, M. Tichý || FLO || align=right | 1.7 km || 
|-id=271 bgcolor=#C2FFFF
| 21271 ||  || — || September 15, 1996 || La Silla || UDTS || L4 || align=right | 21 km || 
|-id=272 bgcolor=#fefefe
| 21272 ||  || — || September 18, 1996 || Xinglong || SCAP || — || align=right | 2.7 km || 
|-id=273 bgcolor=#fefefe
| 21273 ||  || — || September 19, 1996 || Kitt Peak || Spacewatch || — || align=right | 2.3 km || 
|-id=274 bgcolor=#E9E9E9
| 21274 ||  || — || September 19, 1996 || Xinglong || SCAP || — || align=right | 2.6 km || 
|-id=275 bgcolor=#fefefe
| 21275 Tosiyasu ||  ||  || September 23, 1996 || Nanyo || T. Okuni || — || align=right | 1.8 km || 
|-id=276 bgcolor=#fefefe
| 21276 Feller ||  ||  || October 8, 1996 || Prescott || P. G. Comba || FLO || align=right | 1.4 km || 
|-id=277 bgcolor=#FFC2E0
| 21277 ||  || — || October 9, 1996 || Haleakala || NEAT || AMO +1km || align=right | 2.1 km || 
|-id=278 bgcolor=#fefefe
| 21278 ||  || — || October 5, 1996 || Xinglong || SCAP || FLO || align=right | 3.3 km || 
|-id=279 bgcolor=#fefefe
| 21279 ||  || — || October 9, 1996 || Kushiro || S. Ueda, H. Kaneda || FLO || align=right | 2.5 km || 
|-id=280 bgcolor=#fefefe
| 21280 ||  || — || October 11, 1996 || Kitami || K. Endate || — || align=right | 2.2 km || 
|-id=281 bgcolor=#fefefe
| 21281 ||  || — || October 13, 1996 || Church Stretton || S. P. Laurie || FLO || align=right | 2.2 km || 
|-id=282 bgcolor=#fefefe
| 21282 Shimizuyuka ||  ||  || October 14, 1996 || Geisei || T. Seki || PHO || align=right | 4.2 km || 
|-id=283 bgcolor=#fefefe
| 21283 ||  || — || October 10, 1996 || Kitt Peak || Spacewatch || — || align=right | 2.3 km || 
|-id=284 bgcolor=#C2FFFF
| 21284 Pandion ||  ||  || October 5, 1996 || La Silla || E. W. Elst || L4 || align=right | 29 km || 
|-id=285 bgcolor=#fefefe
| 21285 || 1996 UZ || — || October 20, 1996 || Oizumi || T. Kobayashi || FLO || align=right | 2.9 km || 
|-id=286 bgcolor=#fefefe
| 21286 ||  || — || October 20, 1996 || Oizumi || T. Kobayashi || FLO || align=right | 2.9 km || 
|-id=287 bgcolor=#fefefe
| 21287 ||  || — || October 31, 1996 || Stroncone || A. Vagnozzi || — || align=right | 1.7 km || 
|-id=288 bgcolor=#fefefe
| 21288 || 1996 VW || — || November 3, 1996 || Oohira || T. Urata || FLO || align=right | 2.0 km || 
|-id=289 bgcolor=#fefefe
| 21289 Giacomel ||  ||  || November 3, 1996 || Sormano || F. Manca, V. Giuliani || V || align=right | 2.0 km || 
|-id=290 bgcolor=#E9E9E9
| 21290 Vydra ||  ||  || November 9, 1996 || Kleť || M. Tichý, Z. Moravec || — || align=right | 4.1 km || 
|-id=291 bgcolor=#fefefe
| 21291 ||  || — || November 12, 1996 || Campo Imperatore || A. Boattini, F. Pedichini || V || align=right | 1.6 km || 
|-id=292 bgcolor=#fefefe
| 21292 Kanetakoichi ||  ||  || November 7, 1996 || Kitami || K. Endate, K. Watanabe || NYS || align=right | 2.6 km || 
|-id=293 bgcolor=#fefefe
| 21293 Fujimototoyoshi ||  ||  || November 7, 1996 || Kitami || K. Endate, K. Watanabe || — || align=right | 3.6 km || 
|-id=294 bgcolor=#fefefe
| 21294 Yamaguchiyuko ||  ||  || November 7, 1996 || Kitami || K. Endate, K. Watanabe || — || align=right | 3.1 km || 
|-id=295 bgcolor=#fefefe
| 21295 ||  || — || November 5, 1996 || Kitt Peak || Spacewatch || V || align=right | 1.8 km || 
|-id=296 bgcolor=#fefefe
| 21296 ||  || — || November 7, 1996 || Kitt Peak || Spacewatch || FLO || align=right | 2.3 km || 
|-id=297 bgcolor=#fefefe
| 21297 ||  || — || November 7, 1996 || Kushiro || S. Ueda, H. Kaneda || — || align=right | 3.2 km || 
|-id=298 bgcolor=#fefefe
| 21298 ||  || — || November 7, 1996 || Kushiro || S. Ueda, H. Kaneda || — || align=right | 3.2 km || 
|-id=299 bgcolor=#E9E9E9
| 21299 || 1996 WC || — || November 16, 1996 || Oizumi || T. Kobayashi || — || align=right | 2.7 km || 
|-id=300 bgcolor=#fefefe
| 21300 ||  || — || November 19, 1996 || Oizumi || T. Kobayashi || FLO || align=right | 3.2 km || 
|}

21301–21400 

|-bgcolor=#fefefe
| 21301 Zanin ||  ||  || November 22, 1996 || Farra d'Isonzo || Farra d'Isonzo || V || align=right | 2.7 km || 
|-id=302 bgcolor=#fefefe
| 21302 Shirakamisanchi || 1996 XU ||  || December 1, 1996 || Chichibu || N. Satō || — || align=right | 2.3 km || 
|-id=303 bgcolor=#fefefe
| 21303 ||  || — || December 2, 1996 || Oizumi || T. Kobayashi || NYS || align=right | 3.8 km || 
|-id=304 bgcolor=#fefefe
| 21304 ||  || — || December 2, 1996 || Oizumi || T. Kobayashi || V || align=right | 3.2 km || 
|-id=305 bgcolor=#fefefe
| 21305 ||  || — || December 2, 1996 || Oizumi || T. Kobayashi || — || align=right | 3.4 km || 
|-id=306 bgcolor=#E9E9E9
| 21306 Marani ||  ||  || December 1, 1996 || Pianoro || V. Goretti || — || align=right | 7.9 km || 
|-id=307 bgcolor=#fefefe
| 21307 ||  || — || December 3, 1996 || Oizumi || T. Kobayashi || — || align=right | 2.9 km || 
|-id=308 bgcolor=#fefefe
| 21308 ||  || — || December 2, 1996 || Pleiade || P. Antolini, F. Castellani || — || align=right | 2.6 km || 
|-id=309 bgcolor=#fefefe
| 21309 ||  || — || December 6, 1996 || Kiso || JSGA || — || align=right | 2.8 km || 
|-id=310 bgcolor=#fefefe
| 21310 ||  || — || December 7, 1996 || Oizumi || T. Kobayashi || FLO || align=right | 3.9 km || 
|-id=311 bgcolor=#fefefe
| 21311 Servius ||  ||  || December 4, 1996 || Colleverde || V. S. Casulli || FLO || align=right | 2.2 km || 
|-id=312 bgcolor=#fefefe
| 21312 ||  || — || December 4, 1996 || Kitt Peak || Spacewatch || NYS || align=right | 2.4 km || 
|-id=313 bgcolor=#fefefe
| 21313 Xiuyanyu ||  ||  || December 10, 1996 || Xinglong || SCAP || FLO || align=right | 4.1 km || 
|-id=314 bgcolor=#fefefe
| 21314 ||  || — || December 10, 1996 || Xinglong || SCAP || — || align=right | 4.9 km || 
|-id=315 bgcolor=#E9E9E9
| 21315 ||  || — || December 5, 1996 || Kitt Peak || Spacewatch || — || align=right | 4.3 km || 
|-id=316 bgcolor=#fefefe
| 21316 ||  || — || December 7, 1996 || Kitt Peak || Spacewatch || — || align=right | 2.1 km || 
|-id=317 bgcolor=#E9E9E9
| 21317 ||  || — || December 12, 1996 || Kleť || Kleť Obs. || — || align=right | 2.7 km || 
|-id=318 bgcolor=#fefefe
| 21318 ||  || — || December 8, 1996 || Xinglong || SCAP || — || align=right | 3.4 km || 
|-id=319 bgcolor=#fefefe
| 21319 ||  || — || December 8, 1996 || Xinglong || SCAP || — || align=right | 8.7 km || 
|-id=320 bgcolor=#E9E9E9
| 21320 ||  || — || December 14, 1996 || Oizumi || T. Kobayashi || — || align=right | 6.4 km || 
|-id=321 bgcolor=#fefefe
| 21321 ||  || — || January 3, 1997 || Oizumi || T. Kobayashi || V || align=right | 2.8 km || 
|-id=322 bgcolor=#E9E9E9
| 21322 ||  || — || January 3, 1997 || Oizumi || T. Kobayashi || — || align=right | 5.9 km || 
|-id=323 bgcolor=#E9E9E9
| 21323 ||  || — || January 6, 1997 || Oizumi || T. Kobayashi || MAR || align=right | 4.2 km || 
|-id=324 bgcolor=#E9E9E9
| 21324 ||  || — || January 2, 1997 || Xinglong || SCAP || RAF || align=right | 2.6 km || 
|-id=325 bgcolor=#fefefe
| 21325 ||  || — || January 2, 1997 || Xinglong || SCAP || — || align=right | 2.9 km || 
|-id=326 bgcolor=#E9E9E9
| 21326 Nitta-machi ||  ||  || January 8, 1997 || Oizumi || T. Kobayashi || — || align=right | 3.5 km || 
|-id=327 bgcolor=#fefefe
| 21327 Yabuzuka ||  ||  || January 11, 1997 || Oizumi || T. Kobayashi || — || align=right | 2.5 km || 
|-id=328 bgcolor=#fefefe
| 21328 Otashi ||  ||  || January 11, 1997 || Oizumi || T. Kobayashi || V || align=right | 2.8 km || 
|-id=329 bgcolor=#fefefe
| 21329 ||  || — || January 12, 1997 || Haleakala || NEAT || — || align=right | 3.6 km || 
|-id=330 bgcolor=#E9E9E9
| 21330 Alanwhitman ||  ||  || January 11, 1997 || Kitt Peak || Spacewatch || — || align=right | 3.4 km || 
|-id=331 bgcolor=#E9E9E9
| 21331 Lodovicoferrari || 1997 BO ||  || January 17, 1997 || Prescott || P. G. Comba || — || align=right | 2.8 km || 
|-id=332 bgcolor=#fefefe
| 21332 || 1997 BX || — || January 18, 1997 || Xinglong || SCAP || NYS || align=right | 5.8 km || 
|-id=333 bgcolor=#fefefe
| 21333 ||  || — || January 30, 1997 || Oizumi || T. Kobayashi || — || align=right | 3.2 km || 
|-id=334 bgcolor=#fefefe
| 21334 ||  || — || January 30, 1997 || Oizumi || T. Kobayashi || — || align=right | 3.2 km || 
|-id=335 bgcolor=#E9E9E9
| 21335 ||  || — || January 31, 1997 || Oizumi || T. Kobayashi || — || align=right | 5.2 km || 
|-id=336 bgcolor=#E9E9E9
| 21336 Andyblanchard ||  ||  || January 31, 1997 || Kitt Peak || Spacewatch || — || align=right | 2.7 km || 
|-id=337 bgcolor=#d6d6d6
| 21337 ||  || — || January 17, 1997 || Campo Imperatore || A. Boattini, A. Di Paola || EOS || align=right | 6.1 km || 
|-id=338 bgcolor=#fefefe
| 21338 || 1997 CZ || — || February 1, 1997 || Oizumi || T. Kobayashi || — || align=right | 3.8 km || 
|-id=339 bgcolor=#fefefe
| 21339 ||  || — || February 1, 1997 || Oizumi || T. Kobayashi || NYS || align=right | 2.2 km || 
|-id=340 bgcolor=#fefefe
| 21340 ||  || — || February 11, 1997 || Oizumi || T. Kobayashi || — || align=right | 3.7 km || 
|-id=341 bgcolor=#fefefe
| 21341 ||  || — || February 12, 1997 || Oizumi || T. Kobayashi || V || align=right | 3.4 km || 
|-id=342 bgcolor=#E9E9E9
| 21342 ||  || — || February 4, 1997 || Xinglong || SCAP || — || align=right | 3.4 km || 
|-id=343 bgcolor=#fefefe
| 21343 || 1997 EF || — || March 1, 1997 || Oizumi || T. Kobayashi || NYS || align=right | 3.5 km || 
|-id=344 bgcolor=#E9E9E9
| 21344 || 1997 EM || — || March 2, 1997 || Oizumi || T. Kobayashi || XIZ || align=right | 4.9 km || 
|-id=345 bgcolor=#E9E9E9
| 21345 ||  || — || March 3, 1997 || Xinglong || SCAP || ADE || align=right | 8.1 km || 
|-id=346 bgcolor=#E9E9E9
| 21346 Marieladislav ||  ||  || March 9, 1997 || Ondřejov || P. Pravec || MAR || align=right | 6.3 km || 
|-id=347 bgcolor=#E9E9E9
| 21347 ||  || — || March 3, 1997 || Xinglong || SCAP || EUN || align=right | 3.8 km || 
|-id=348 bgcolor=#E9E9E9
| 21348 Toyoteru ||  ||  || March 1, 1997 || Chichibu || N. Satō || MAR || align=right | 3.2 km || 
|-id=349 bgcolor=#d6d6d6
| 21349 Bevoke ||  ||  || March 10, 1997 || Kitt Peak || Spacewatch || THM || align=right | 6.7 km || 
|-id=350 bgcolor=#E9E9E9
| 21350 Billgardner ||  ||  || March 11, 1997 || Kitt Peak || Spacewatch || — || align=right | 3.2 km || 
|-id=351 bgcolor=#E9E9E9
| 21351 Bhagwat ||  ||  || March 4, 1997 || Socorro || LINEAR || EUN || align=right | 4.4 km || 
|-id=352 bgcolor=#d6d6d6
| 21352 ||  || — || March 10, 1997 || La Silla || E. W. Elst || KOR || align=right | 5.3 km || 
|-id=353 bgcolor=#d6d6d6
| 21353 || 1997 FG || — || March 19, 1997 || Xinglong || SCAP || — || align=right | 13 km || 
|-id=354 bgcolor=#E9E9E9
| 21354 || 1997 FM || — || March 21, 1997 || Xinglong || SCAP || — || align=right | 3.8 km || 
|-id=355 bgcolor=#d6d6d6
| 21355 Pikovskaya ||  ||  || March 31, 1997 || Socorro || LINEAR || KOR || align=right | 4.6 km || 
|-id=356 bgcolor=#E9E9E9
| 21356 Karlplank ||  ||  || March 31, 1997 || Socorro || LINEAR || — || align=right | 8.8 km || 
|-id=357 bgcolor=#d6d6d6
| 21357 Davidying ||  ||  || March 31, 1997 || Socorro || LINEAR || KOR || align=right | 3.3 km || 
|-id=358 bgcolor=#E9E9E9
| 21358 Mijerbarany ||  ||  || April 3, 1997 || Socorro || LINEAR || — || align=right | 3.2 km || 
|-id=359 bgcolor=#d6d6d6
| 21359 Geng ||  ||  || April 6, 1997 || Socorro || LINEAR || KOR || align=right | 3.9 km || 
|-id=360 bgcolor=#d6d6d6
| 21360 Bobduff ||  ||  || April 8, 1997 || Kitt Peak || Spacewatch || THM || align=right | 8.8 km || 
|-id=361 bgcolor=#fefefe
| 21361 Carsonmark || 1997 HQ ||  || April 28, 1997 || Kitt Peak || Spacewatch || V || align=right | 3.5 km || 
|-id=362 bgcolor=#d6d6d6
| 21362 Dickarmstrong ||  ||  || April 30, 1997 || Kitt Peak || Spacewatch || — || align=right | 4.1 km || 
|-id=363 bgcolor=#d6d6d6
| 21363 Jotwani ||  ||  || April 30, 1997 || Socorro || LINEAR || EOS || align=right | 4.3 km || 
|-id=364 bgcolor=#E9E9E9
| 21364 Lingpan ||  ||  || April 30, 1997 || Socorro || LINEAR || MIS || align=right | 7.1 km || 
|-id=365 bgcolor=#E9E9E9
| 21365 ||  || — || May 3, 1997 || Xinglong || SCAP || — || align=right | 4.1 km || 
|-id=366 bgcolor=#d6d6d6
| 21366 ||  || — || May 3, 1997 || La Silla || E. W. Elst || KOR || align=right | 7.4 km || 
|-id=367 bgcolor=#d6d6d6
| 21367 Edwardpleva ||  ||  || June 2, 1997 || Kitt Peak || Spacewatch || — || align=right | 12 km || 
|-id=368 bgcolor=#d6d6d6
| 21368 Shiodayama ||  ||  || June 6, 1997 || Nanyo || T. Okuni || EOS || align=right | 9.3 km || 
|-id=369 bgcolor=#d6d6d6
| 21369 Gertfinger ||  ||  || July 8, 1997 || Caussols || ODAS || slow? || align=right | 10 km || 
|-id=370 bgcolor=#C2FFFF
| 21370 ||  || — || October 1, 1997 || La Silla || UDTS || L4 || align=right | 29 km || 
|-id=371 bgcolor=#C2FFFF
| 21371 ||  || — || October 1, 1997 || La Silla || UDTS || L4 || align=right | 23 km || 
|-id=372 bgcolor=#C2FFFF
| 21372 ||  || — || October 6, 1997 || La Silla || UDTS || L4 || align=right | 24 km || 
|-id=373 bgcolor=#E9E9E9
| 21373 ||  || — || November 9, 1997 || Oizumi || T. Kobayashi || — || align=right | 7.8 km || 
|-id=374 bgcolor=#FFC2E0
| 21374 ||  || — || November 24, 1997 || Siding Spring || M. Hartley || AMO +1km || align=right | 1.1 km || 
|-id=375 bgcolor=#fefefe
| 21375 Fanshawe ||  ||  || December 31, 1997 || Kitt Peak || Spacewatch || — || align=right | 2.0 km || 
|-id=376 bgcolor=#fefefe
| 21376 ||  || — || January 25, 1998 || Oizumi || T. Kobayashi || FLO || align=right | 2.8 km || 
|-id=377 bgcolor=#E9E9E9
| 21377 ||  || — || February 6, 1998 || Xinglong || SCAP || — || align=right | 3.1 km || 
|-id=378 bgcolor=#E9E9E9
| 21378 ||  || — || February 6, 1998 || La Silla || E. W. Elst || — || align=right | 11 km || 
|-id=379 bgcolor=#fefefe
| 21379 ||  || — || February 27, 1998 || Caussols || ODAS || V || align=right | 1.4 km || 
|-id=380 bgcolor=#fefefe
| 21380 Devanssay ||  ||  || February 27, 1998 || Caussols || ODAS || FLO || align=right | 2.8 km || 
|-id=381 bgcolor=#fefefe
| 21381 || 1998 EN || — || March 2, 1998 || Caussols || ODAS || — || align=right | 2.3 km || 
|-id=382 bgcolor=#fefefe
| 21382 ||  || — || March 2, 1998 || Xinglong || SCAP || — || align=right | 1.9 km || 
|-id=383 bgcolor=#E9E9E9
| 21383 ||  || — || March 2, 1998 || Xinglong || SCAP || — || align=right | 3.1 km || 
|-id=384 bgcolor=#fefefe
| 21384 ||  || — || March 1, 1998 || Xinglong || SCAP || — || align=right | 2.8 km || 
|-id=385 bgcolor=#fefefe
| 21385 ||  || — || March 22, 1998 || Kitt Peak || Spacewatch || MAS || align=right | 1.9 km || 
|-id=386 bgcolor=#fefefe
| 21386 ||  || — || March 22, 1998 || Kitt Peak || Spacewatch || — || align=right | 2.8 km || 
|-id=387 bgcolor=#fefefe
| 21387 Wafakhalil ||  ||  || March 20, 1998 || Socorro || LINEAR || — || align=right | 2.5 km || 
|-id=388 bgcolor=#fefefe
| 21388 Moyanodeburt ||  ||  || March 20, 1998 || Socorro || LINEAR || — || align=right | 2.2 km || 
|-id=389 bgcolor=#fefefe
| 21389 Pshenichka ||  ||  || March 20, 1998 || Socorro || LINEAR || — || align=right | 2.0 km || 
|-id=390 bgcolor=#fefefe
| 21390 Shindo ||  ||  || March 20, 1998 || Socorro || LINEAR || MAS || align=right | 3.3 km || 
|-id=391 bgcolor=#fefefe
| 21391 Rotanner ||  ||  || March 20, 1998 || Socorro || LINEAR || FLO || align=right | 1.9 km || 
|-id=392 bgcolor=#fefefe
| 21392 Helibrochier ||  ||  || March 20, 1998 || Socorro || LINEAR || V || align=right | 2.2 km || 
|-id=393 bgcolor=#fefefe
| 21393 Kalygeringer ||  ||  || March 20, 1998 || Socorro || LINEAR || NYS || align=right | 3.8 km || 
|-id=394 bgcolor=#fefefe
| 21394 Justinbecker ||  ||  || March 20, 1998 || Socorro || LINEAR || FLO || align=right | 2.9 km || 
|-id=395 bgcolor=#fefefe
| 21395 Albertofilho ||  ||  || March 20, 1998 || Socorro || LINEAR || — || align=right | 3.6 km || 
|-id=396 bgcolor=#fefefe
| 21396 Fisher-Ives ||  ||  || March 20, 1998 || Socorro || LINEAR || NYS || align=right | 1.9 km || 
|-id=397 bgcolor=#fefefe
| 21397 Leontovich ||  ||  || March 20, 1998 || Socorro || LINEAR || V || align=right | 2.1 km || 
|-id=398 bgcolor=#fefefe
| 21398 Zengguoshou ||  ||  || March 20, 1998 || Socorro || LINEAR || — || align=right | 3.7 km || 
|-id=399 bgcolor=#fefefe
| 21399 Bateman ||  ||  || March 20, 1998 || Socorro || LINEAR || V || align=right | 1.9 km || 
|-id=400 bgcolor=#fefefe
| 21400 Ahdout ||  ||  || March 20, 1998 || Socorro || LINEAR || — || align=right | 2.5 km || 
|}

21401–21500 

|-bgcolor=#fefefe
| 21401 Justinkovac ||  ||  || March 20, 1998 || Socorro || LINEAR || NYS || align=right | 2.3 km || 
|-id=402 bgcolor=#fefefe
| 21402 Shanhuang ||  ||  || March 20, 1998 || Socorro || LINEAR || — || align=right | 1.8 km || 
|-id=403 bgcolor=#fefefe
| 21403 Haken ||  ||  || March 20, 1998 || Socorro || LINEAR || — || align=right | 5.4 km || 
|-id=404 bgcolor=#fefefe
| 21404 Atluri ||  ||  || March 20, 1998 || Socorro || LINEAR || — || align=right | 3.5 km || 
|-id=405 bgcolor=#fefefe
| 21405 Sagarmehta ||  ||  || March 20, 1998 || Socorro || LINEAR || — || align=right | 1.9 km || 
|-id=406 bgcolor=#fefefe
| 21406 Jimyang ||  ||  || March 20, 1998 || Socorro || LINEAR || V || align=right | 2.9 km || 
|-id=407 bgcolor=#d6d6d6
| 21407 Jessicabaker ||  ||  || March 20, 1998 || Socorro || LINEAR || — || align=right | 4.8 km || 
|-id=408 bgcolor=#fefefe
| 21408 Lyrahaas ||  ||  || March 20, 1998 || Socorro || LINEAR || — || align=right | 4.2 km || 
|-id=409 bgcolor=#fefefe
| 21409 Forbes ||  ||  || March 20, 1998 || Socorro || LINEAR || FLO || align=right | 2.2 km || 
|-id=410 bgcolor=#fefefe
| 21410 Cahill ||  ||  || March 20, 1998 || Socorro || LINEAR || — || align=right | 4.7 km || 
|-id=411 bgcolor=#fefefe
| 21411 Abifraeman ||  ||  || March 20, 1998 || Socorro || LINEAR || — || align=right | 4.8 km || 
|-id=412 bgcolor=#fefefe
| 21412 Sinchanban ||  ||  || March 20, 1998 || Socorro || LINEAR || — || align=right | 2.4 km || 
|-id=413 bgcolor=#fefefe
| 21413 Albertsao ||  ||  || March 20, 1998 || Socorro || LINEAR || — || align=right | 3.5 km || 
|-id=414 bgcolor=#fefefe
| 21414 Blumenthal ||  ||  || March 20, 1998 || Socorro || LINEAR || — || align=right | 3.3 km || 
|-id=415 bgcolor=#fefefe
| 21415 Nicobrenner ||  ||  || March 20, 1998 || Socorro || LINEAR || NYS || align=right | 3.6 km || 
|-id=416 bgcolor=#fefefe
| 21416 Sisichen ||  ||  || March 20, 1998 || Socorro || LINEAR || V || align=right | 2.4 km || 
|-id=417 bgcolor=#fefefe
| 21417 Kelleyharris ||  ||  || March 20, 1998 || Socorro || LINEAR || — || align=right | 2.1 km || 
|-id=418 bgcolor=#fefefe
| 21418 Bustos ||  ||  || March 20, 1998 || Socorro || LINEAR || — || align=right | 2.7 km || 
|-id=419 bgcolor=#fefefe
| 21419 Devience ||  ||  || March 20, 1998 || Socorro || LINEAR || — || align=right | 2.2 km || 
|-id=420 bgcolor=#fefefe
| 21420 ||  || — || March 21, 1998 || Bergisch Gladbach || W. Bickel || FLO || align=right | 1.8 km || 
|-id=421 bgcolor=#fefefe
| 21421 Nealwadhwa ||  ||  || March 24, 1998 || Socorro || LINEAR || — || align=right | 3.1 km || 
|-id=422 bgcolor=#fefefe
| 21422 Alexacarey ||  ||  || March 24, 1998 || Socorro || LINEAR || — || align=right | 4.7 km || 
|-id=423 bgcolor=#fefefe
| 21423 Credo ||  ||  || March 24, 1998 || Socorro || LINEAR || — || align=right | 2.3 km || 
|-id=424 bgcolor=#fefefe
| 21424 Faithchang ||  ||  || March 24, 1998 || Socorro || LINEAR || FLO || align=right | 2.1 km || 
|-id=425 bgcolor=#fefefe
| 21425 Cordwell ||  ||  || March 24, 1998 || Socorro || LINEAR || — || align=right | 3.3 km || 
|-id=426 bgcolor=#fefefe
| 21426 Davidbauer ||  ||  || March 24, 1998 || Socorro || LINEAR || — || align=right | 2.4 km || 
|-id=427 bgcolor=#fefefe
| 21427 Ryanharrison ||  ||  || March 31, 1998 || Socorro || LINEAR || FLO || align=right | 2.4 km || 
|-id=428 bgcolor=#fefefe
| 21428 Junehokim ||  ||  || March 31, 1998 || Socorro || LINEAR || — || align=right | 2.5 km || 
|-id=429 bgcolor=#fefefe
| 21429 Gulati ||  ||  || March 31, 1998 || Socorro || LINEAR || — || align=right | 2.6 km || 
|-id=430 bgcolor=#fefefe
| 21430 Brubrew ||  ||  || March 31, 1998 || Socorro || LINEAR || V || align=right | 1.9 km || 
|-id=431 bgcolor=#fefefe
| 21431 Amberhess ||  ||  || March 31, 1998 || Socorro || LINEAR || V || align=right | 2.4 km || 
|-id=432 bgcolor=#fefefe
| 21432 Polingloh ||  ||  || March 31, 1998 || Socorro || LINEAR || slow || align=right | 2.1 km || 
|-id=433 bgcolor=#fefefe
| 21433 Stekramer ||  ||  || March 31, 1998 || Socorro || LINEAR || — || align=right | 2.5 km || 
|-id=434 bgcolor=#fefefe
| 21434 Stanchiang ||  ||  || March 31, 1998 || Socorro || LINEAR || — || align=right | 3.2 km || 
|-id=435 bgcolor=#fefefe
| 21435 Aharon ||  ||  || March 31, 1998 || Socorro || LINEAR || — || align=right | 2.5 km || 
|-id=436 bgcolor=#fefefe
| 21436 Chaoyichi ||  ||  || March 31, 1998 || Socorro || LINEAR || moon || align=right | 2.0 km || 
|-id=437 bgcolor=#E9E9E9
| 21437 Georgechen ||  ||  || March 31, 1998 || Socorro || LINEAR || EUN || align=right | 5.1 km || 
|-id=438 bgcolor=#fefefe
| 21438 Camibarnett ||  ||  || March 20, 1998 || Socorro || LINEAR || — || align=right | 4.3 km || 
|-id=439 bgcolor=#fefefe
| 21439 Robenzing ||  ||  || March 20, 1998 || Socorro || LINEAR || — || align=right | 2.2 km || 
|-id=440 bgcolor=#fefefe
| 21440 Elizacollins ||  ||  || March 24, 1998 || Socorro || LINEAR || — || align=right | 2.3 km || 
|-id=441 bgcolor=#fefefe
| 21441 Stevencondie ||  ||  || March 29, 1998 || Socorro || LINEAR || — || align=right | 3.6 km || 
|-id=442 bgcolor=#fefefe
| 21442 ||  || — || April 4, 1998 || Woomera || F. B. Zoltowski || FLO || align=right | 1.9 km || 
|-id=443 bgcolor=#fefefe
| 21443 ||  || — || April 17, 1998 || Kitt Peak || Spacewatch || — || align=right | 5.7 km || 
|-id=444 bgcolor=#fefefe
| 21444 ||  || — || April 17, 1998 || Kitt Peak || Spacewatch || V || align=right | 3.0 km || 
|-id=445 bgcolor=#fefefe
| 21445 Pegconnolly ||  ||  || April 18, 1998 || Socorro || LINEAR || — || align=right | 3.1 km || 
|-id=446 bgcolor=#E9E9E9
| 21446 Tedflint ||  ||  || April 18, 1998 || Socorro || LINEAR || — || align=right | 2.8 km || 
|-id=447 bgcolor=#fefefe
| 21447 Yungchieh ||  ||  || April 18, 1998 || Socorro || LINEAR || NYS || align=right | 2.3 km || 
|-id=448 bgcolor=#fefefe
| 21448 Galindo ||  ||  || April 20, 1998 || Socorro || LINEAR || FLO || align=right | 1.8 km || 
|-id=449 bgcolor=#fefefe
| 21449 Hemmick ||  ||  || April 20, 1998 || Socorro || LINEAR || — || align=right | 1.9 km || 
|-id=450 bgcolor=#fefefe
| 21450 Kissel ||  ||  || April 20, 1998 || Socorro || LINEAR || — || align=right | 3.0 km || 
|-id=451 bgcolor=#fefefe
| 21451 Fisher ||  ||  || April 28, 1998 || Prescott || P. G. Comba || — || align=right | 2.8 km || 
|-id=452 bgcolor=#fefefe
| 21452 ||  || — || April 23, 1998 || Haleakala || NEAT || — || align=right | 5.9 km || 
|-id=453 bgcolor=#fefefe
| 21453 Victorlevine ||  ||  || April 20, 1998 || Socorro || LINEAR || V || align=right | 1.9 km || 
|-id=454 bgcolor=#d6d6d6
| 21454 Chernoby ||  ||  || April 20, 1998 || Socorro || LINEAR || VER || align=right | 13 km || 
|-id=455 bgcolor=#E9E9E9
| 21455 Mcfarland ||  ||  || April 20, 1998 || Socorro || LINEAR || — || align=right | 2.9 km || 
|-id=456 bgcolor=#fefefe
| 21456 Myers ||  ||  || April 20, 1998 || Socorro || LINEAR || — || align=right | 2.2 km || 
|-id=457 bgcolor=#fefefe
| 21457 Fevig ||  ||  || April 25, 1998 || Anderson Mesa || LONEOS || — || align=right | 2.4 km || 
|-id=458 bgcolor=#fefefe
| 21458 Susank ||  ||  || April 25, 1998 || Anderson Mesa || LONEOS || — || align=right | 3.2 km || 
|-id=459 bgcolor=#fefefe
| 21459 Chrisrussell ||  ||  || April 30, 1998 || Anderson Mesa || LONEOS || V || align=right | 3.5 km || 
|-id=460 bgcolor=#fefefe
| 21460 Ryozo ||  ||  || April 30, 1998 || Nanyo || T. Okuni || — || align=right | 2.7 km || 
|-id=461 bgcolor=#fefefe
| 21461 Alexchernyak ||  ||  || April 21, 1998 || Socorro || LINEAR || — || align=right | 4.1 km || 
|-id=462 bgcolor=#fefefe
| 21462 Karenedbal ||  ||  || April 21, 1998 || Socorro || LINEAR || — || align=right | 6.5 km || 
|-id=463 bgcolor=#fefefe
| 21463 Nickerson ||  ||  || April 21, 1998 || Socorro || LINEAR || V || align=right | 2.6 km || 
|-id=464 bgcolor=#fefefe
| 21464 Chinaroonchai ||  ||  || April 21, 1998 || Socorro || LINEAR || — || align=right | 3.0 km || 
|-id=465 bgcolor=#fefefe
| 21465 Michelepatt ||  ||  || April 21, 1998 || Socorro || LINEAR || FLO || align=right | 1.8 km || 
|-id=466 bgcolor=#fefefe
| 21466 Franpelrine ||  ||  || April 21, 1998 || Socorro || LINEAR || NYS || align=right | 2.7 km || 
|-id=467 bgcolor=#fefefe
| 21467 Rosenstein ||  ||  || April 21, 1998 || Socorro || LINEAR || — || align=right | 2.1 km || 
|-id=468 bgcolor=#E9E9E9
| 21468 Saylor ||  ||  || April 21, 1998 || Socorro || LINEAR || — || align=right | 3.9 km || 
|-id=469 bgcolor=#fefefe
| 21469 Robschum ||  ||  || April 21, 1998 || Socorro || LINEAR || NYS || align=right | 1.7 km || 
|-id=470 bgcolor=#E9E9E9
| 21470 Frankchuang ||  ||  || April 21, 1998 || Socorro || LINEAR || — || align=right | 5.3 km || 
|-id=471 bgcolor=#E9E9E9
| 21471 Pavelchvykov ||  ||  || April 21, 1998 || Socorro || LINEAR || ADE || align=right | 8.1 km || 
|-id=472 bgcolor=#fefefe
| 21472 Stimson ||  ||  || April 21, 1998 || Socorro || LINEAR || — || align=right | 2.5 km || 
|-id=473 bgcolor=#fefefe
| 21473 Petesullivan ||  ||  || April 21, 1998 || Socorro || LINEAR || — || align=right | 3.0 km || 
|-id=474 bgcolor=#fefefe
| 21474 Pamelatsai ||  ||  || April 21, 1998 || Socorro || LINEAR || V || align=right | 1.6 km || 
|-id=475 bgcolor=#fefefe
| 21475 Jasonclain ||  ||  || April 21, 1998 || Socorro || LINEAR || — || align=right | 4.1 km || 
|-id=476 bgcolor=#fefefe
| 21476 Petrie ||  ||  || April 28, 1998 || Reedy Creek || J. Broughton || — || align=right | 3.9 km || 
|-id=477 bgcolor=#E9E9E9
| 21477 Terikdaly ||  ||  || April 23, 1998 || Socorro || LINEAR || — || align=right | 3.1 km || 
|-id=478 bgcolor=#d6d6d6
| 21478 Maggiedelano ||  ||  || April 23, 1998 || Socorro || LINEAR || — || align=right | 5.7 km || 
|-id=479 bgcolor=#fefefe
| 21479 Marymartha ||  ||  || April 23, 1998 || Socorro || LINEAR || FLO || align=right | 3.7 km || 
|-id=480 bgcolor=#fefefe
| 21480 Jilltucker ||  ||  || April 23, 1998 || Socorro || LINEAR || V || align=right | 1.9 km || 
|-id=481 bgcolor=#fefefe
| 21481 Johnwarren ||  ||  || April 23, 1998 || Socorro || LINEAR || V || align=right | 2.6 km || 
|-id=482 bgcolor=#fefefe
| 21482 Patashnick ||  ||  || April 19, 1998 || Socorro || LINEAR || NYS || align=right | 2.8 km || 
|-id=483 bgcolor=#fefefe
| 21483 Abdulrasool ||  ||  || April 19, 1998 || Socorro || LINEAR || FLO || align=right | 2.4 km || 
|-id=484 bgcolor=#fefefe
| 21484 Eppard ||  ||  || April 19, 1998 || Socorro || LINEAR || V || align=right | 2.9 km || 
|-id=485 bgcolor=#fefefe
| 21485 Ash ||  ||  || April 20, 1998 || Socorro || LINEAR || V || align=right | 2.2 km || 
|-id=486 bgcolor=#fefefe
| 21486 ||  || — || April 25, 1998 || La Silla || E. W. Elst || — || align=right | 4.1 km || 
|-id=487 bgcolor=#d6d6d6
| 21487 ||  || — || April 25, 1998 || La Silla || E. W. Elst || — || align=right | 7.9 km || 
|-id=488 bgcolor=#fefefe
| 21488 Danyellelee ||  ||  || April 21, 1998 || Socorro || LINEAR || — || align=right | 2.2 km || 
|-id=489 bgcolor=#fefefe
| 21489 || 1998 JU || — || May 1, 1998 || Haleakala || NEAT || — || align=right | 5.0 km || 
|-id=490 bgcolor=#E9E9E9
| 21490 || 1998 JW || — || May 1, 1998 || Haleakala || NEAT || — || align=right | 6.6 km || 
|-id=491 bgcolor=#fefefe
| 21491 ||  || — || May 1, 1998 || Haleakala || NEAT || NYS || align=right | 1.8 km || 
|-id=492 bgcolor=#fefefe
| 21492 ||  || — || May 1, 1998 || Haleakala || NEAT || — || align=right | 2.9 km || 
|-id=493 bgcolor=#fefefe
| 21493 ||  || — || May 1, 1998 || Haleakala || NEAT || NYS || align=right | 7.8 km || 
|-id=494 bgcolor=#fefefe
| 21494 ||  || — || May 1, 1998 || Haleakala || NEAT || NYS || align=right | 2.8 km || 
|-id=495 bgcolor=#fefefe
| 21495 Feaga ||  ||  || May 1, 1998 || Anderson Mesa || LONEOS || — || align=right | 3.6 km || 
|-id=496 bgcolor=#E9E9E9
| 21496 Lijianyang ||  ||  || May 1, 1998 || Anderson Mesa || LONEOS || — || align=right | 7.3 km || 
|-id=497 bgcolor=#fefefe
| 21497 Alicehine ||  ||  || May 1, 1998 || Anderson Mesa || LONEOS || — || align=right | 2.4 km || 
|-id=498 bgcolor=#fefefe
| 21498 Keenanferar ||  ||  || May 22, 1998 || Socorro || LINEAR || PHO || align=right | 3.9 km || 
|-id=499 bgcolor=#fefefe
| 21499 Perillat ||  ||  || May 22, 1998 || Anderson Mesa || LONEOS || — || align=right | 4.2 km || 
|-id=500 bgcolor=#fefefe
| 21500 Vazquez ||  ||  || May 22, 1998 || Anderson Mesa || LONEOS || — || align=right | 4.8 km || 
|}

21501–21600 

|-bgcolor=#fefefe
| 21501 Acevedo ||  ||  || May 23, 1998 || Anderson Mesa || LONEOS || V || align=right | 2.3 km || 
|-id=502 bgcolor=#E9E9E9
| 21502 Cruz ||  ||  || May 24, 1998 || Anderson Mesa || LONEOS || — || align=right | 3.2 km || 
|-id=503 bgcolor=#E9E9E9
| 21503 Beksha ||  ||  || May 22, 1998 || Socorro || LINEAR || — || align=right | 2.6 km || 
|-id=504 bgcolor=#E9E9E9
| 21504 Caseyfreeman ||  ||  || May 22, 1998 || Socorro || LINEAR || — || align=right | 5.3 km || 
|-id=505 bgcolor=#fefefe
| 21505 Bernert ||  ||  || May 22, 1998 || Socorro || LINEAR || FLO || align=right | 2.6 km || 
|-id=506 bgcolor=#fefefe
| 21506 Betsill ||  ||  || May 22, 1998 || Socorro || LINEAR || — || align=right | 3.8 km || 
|-id=507 bgcolor=#fefefe
| 21507 Bhasin ||  ||  || May 22, 1998 || Socorro || LINEAR || NYS || align=right | 1.9 km || 
|-id=508 bgcolor=#E9E9E9
| 21508 Benbrewer ||  ||  || May 22, 1998 || Socorro || LINEAR || — || align=right | 3.8 km || 
|-id=509 bgcolor=#fefefe
| 21509 Lucascavin ||  ||  || May 22, 1998 || Socorro || LINEAR || LCA || align=right | 3.1 km || 
|-id=510 bgcolor=#E9E9E9
| 21510 Chemnitz ||  ||  || May 22, 1998 || Socorro || LINEAR || — || align=right | 5.2 km || 
|-id=511 bgcolor=#fefefe
| 21511 Chiardola ||  ||  || May 22, 1998 || Socorro || LINEAR || FLO || align=right | 2.8 km || 
|-id=512 bgcolor=#fefefe
| 21512 Susieclary ||  ||  || May 22, 1998 || Socorro || LINEAR || FLO || align=right | 3.5 km || 
|-id=513 bgcolor=#fefefe
| 21513 Bethcochran ||  ||  || May 22, 1998 || Socorro || LINEAR || V || align=right | 2.9 km || 
|-id=514 bgcolor=#E9E9E9
| 21514 Gamalski ||  ||  || May 22, 1998 || Socorro || LINEAR || — || align=right | 6.3 km || 
|-id=515 bgcolor=#E9E9E9
| 21515 Gavini ||  ||  || May 23, 1998 || Socorro || LINEAR || — || align=right | 4.1 km || 
|-id=516 bgcolor=#E9E9E9
| 21516 Mariagodinez ||  ||  || May 23, 1998 || Socorro || LINEAR || — || align=right | 5.7 km || 
|-id=517 bgcolor=#fefefe
| 21517 Dobi ||  ||  || May 23, 1998 || Socorro || LINEAR || — || align=right | 3.3 km || 
|-id=518 bgcolor=#E9E9E9
| 21518 Maysunhasan ||  ||  || May 23, 1998 || Socorro || LINEAR || EUN || align=right | 5.2 km || 
|-id=519 bgcolor=#fefefe
| 21519 Josephhenry ||  ||  || May 23, 1998 || Socorro || LINEAR || — || align=right | 3.8 km || 
|-id=520 bgcolor=#d6d6d6
| 21520 Dianaeheart ||  ||  || May 23, 1998 || Socorro || LINEAR || — || align=right | 8.7 km || 
|-id=521 bgcolor=#E9E9E9
| 21521 Hippalgaonkar ||  ||  || May 23, 1998 || Socorro || LINEAR || — || align=right | 6.2 km || 
|-id=522 bgcolor=#E9E9E9
| 21522 Entwisle ||  ||  || June 19, 1998 || Socorro || LINEAR || RAF || align=right | 3.3 km || 
|-id=523 bgcolor=#d6d6d6
| 21523 GONG ||  ||  || June 26, 1998 || Goodricke-Pigott || R. A. Tucker || — || align=right | 10 km || 
|-id=524 bgcolor=#d6d6d6
| 21524 ||  || — || June 21, 1998 || Kitt Peak || Spacewatch || KOR || align=right | 4.5 km || 
|-id=525 bgcolor=#E9E9E9
| 21525 ||  || — || June 25, 1998 || Kitt Peak || Spacewatch || DOR || align=right | 12 km || 
|-id=526 bgcolor=#E9E9E9
| 21526 Mirano ||  ||  || June 30, 1998 || Farra d'Isonzo || Farra d'Isonzo || — || align=right | 4.1 km || 
|-id=527 bgcolor=#E9E9E9
| 21527 Horton ||  ||  || June 24, 1998 || Socorro || LINEAR || EUNmoon || align=right | 5.0 km || 
|-id=528 bgcolor=#fefefe
| 21528 Chrisfaust ||  ||  || June 24, 1998 || Socorro || LINEAR || — || align=right | 3.6 km || 
|-id=529 bgcolor=#d6d6d6
| 21529 Johnjames ||  ||  || June 26, 1998 || Socorro || LINEAR || ITH || align=right | 6.1 km || 
|-id=530 bgcolor=#E9E9E9
| 21530 Despiau ||  ||  || June 26, 1998 || Anderson Mesa || LONEOS || — || align=right | 13 km || 
|-id=531 bgcolor=#E9E9E9
| 21531 Billcollin || 1998 OS ||  || July 20, 1998 || Caussols || ODAS || — || align=right | 6.3 km || 
|-id=532 bgcolor=#d6d6d6
| 21532 || 1998 OY || — || July 20, 1998 || Caussols || ODAS || — || align=right | 7.1 km || 
|-id=533 bgcolor=#d6d6d6
| 21533 ||  || — || July 26, 1998 || La Silla || E. W. Elst || KOR || align=right | 6.4 km || 
|-id=534 bgcolor=#E9E9E9
| 21534 ||  || — || July 26, 1998 || La Silla || E. W. Elst || HOF || align=right | 12 km || 
|-id=535 bgcolor=#d6d6d6
| 21535 ||  || — || July 26, 1998 || La Silla || E. W. Elst || — || align=right | 9.4 km || 
|-id=536 bgcolor=#E9E9E9
| 21536 ||  || — || July 26, 1998 || La Silla || E. W. Elst || MAR || align=right | 6.0 km || 
|-id=537 bgcolor=#d6d6d6
| 21537 Fréchet || 1998 PQ ||  || August 15, 1998 || Prescott || P. G. Comba || THM || align=right | 7.2 km || 
|-id=538 bgcolor=#d6d6d6
| 21538 ||  || — || August 17, 1998 || Višnjan Observatory || Višnjan Obs. || — || align=right | 9.5 km || 
|-id=539 bgcolor=#d6d6d6
| 21539 Josefhlávka ||  ||  || August 20, 1998 || Ondřejov || P. Pravec || — || align=right | 12 km || 
|-id=540 bgcolor=#d6d6d6
| 21540 Itthipanyanan ||  ||  || August 17, 1998 || Socorro || LINEAR || ALA || align=right | 12 km || 
|-id=541 bgcolor=#d6d6d6
| 21541 Friskop ||  ||  || August 17, 1998 || Socorro || LINEAR || EOS || align=right | 5.7 km || 
|-id=542 bgcolor=#d6d6d6
| 21542 Kennajeannet ||  ||  || August 17, 1998 || Socorro || LINEAR || — || align=right | 15 km || 
|-id=543 bgcolor=#d6d6d6
| 21543 Jessop ||  ||  || August 17, 1998 || Socorro || LINEAR || — || align=right | 9.7 km || 
|-id=544 bgcolor=#E9E9E9
| 21544 Hermainkhan ||  ||  || August 17, 1998 || Socorro || LINEAR || — || align=right | 4.5 km || 
|-id=545 bgcolor=#d6d6d6
| 21545 Koirala ||  ||  || August 17, 1998 || Socorro || LINEAR || — || align=right | 10 km || 
|-id=546 bgcolor=#E9E9E9
| 21546 Konermann ||  ||  || August 17, 1998 || Socorro || LINEAR || — || align=right | 4.8 km || 
|-id=547 bgcolor=#d6d6d6
| 21547 Kottapalli ||  ||  || August 17, 1998 || Socorro || LINEAR || THM || align=right | 11 km || 
|-id=548 bgcolor=#E9E9E9
| 21548 Briekugler ||  ||  || August 17, 1998 || Socorro || LINEAR || — || align=right | 11 km || 
|-id=549 bgcolor=#d6d6d6
| 21549 Carolinelang ||  ||  || August 17, 1998 || Socorro || LINEAR || — || align=right | 8.0 km || 
|-id=550 bgcolor=#E9E9E9
| 21550 Laviolette ||  ||  || August 17, 1998 || Socorro || LINEAR || — || align=right | 10 km || 
|-id=551 bgcolor=#d6d6d6
| 21551 Geyang ||  ||  || August 17, 1998 || Socorro || LINEAR || EOS || align=right | 6.7 km || 
|-id=552 bgcolor=#E9E9E9
| 21552 Richardlee ||  ||  || August 17, 1998 || Socorro || LINEAR || HNS || align=right | 5.6 km || 
|-id=553 bgcolor=#fefefe
| 21553 Monchicourt ||  ||  || August 26, 1998 || Caussols || ODAS || — || align=right | 2.4 km || 
|-id=554 bgcolor=#d6d6d6
| 21554 Leechaohsi ||  ||  || August 24, 1998 || Socorro || LINEAR || — || align=right | 15 km || 
|-id=555 bgcolor=#d6d6d6
| 21555 Levary ||  ||  || August 24, 1998 || Socorro || LINEAR || URS || align=right | 19 km || 
|-id=556 bgcolor=#fefefe
| 21556 Christineli ||  ||  || August 24, 1998 || Socorro || LINEAR || — || align=right | 5.0 km || 
|-id=557 bgcolor=#d6d6d6
| 21557 Daniellitt ||  ||  || August 24, 1998 || Socorro || LINEAR || EOS || align=right | 12 km || 
|-id=558 bgcolor=#E9E9E9
| 21558 Alisonliu ||  ||  || August 24, 1998 || Socorro || LINEAR || EUN || align=right | 6.7 km || 
|-id=559 bgcolor=#E9E9E9
| 21559 Jingyuanluo ||  ||  || August 24, 1998 || Socorro || LINEAR || MIT || align=right | 10 km || 
|-id=560 bgcolor=#d6d6d6
| 21560 Analyons ||  ||  || August 28, 1998 || Socorro || LINEAR || EOS || align=right | 8.5 km || 
|-id=561 bgcolor=#E9E9E9
| 21561 Masterman ||  ||  || August 28, 1998 || Socorro || LINEAR || EUN || align=right | 7.1 km || 
|-id=562 bgcolor=#E9E9E9
| 21562 Chrismessick ||  ||  || August 19, 1998 || Socorro || LINEAR || EUN || align=right | 3.6 km || 
|-id=563 bgcolor=#E9E9E9
| 21563 Chetgervais ||  ||  || August 19, 1998 || Socorro || LINEAR || — || align=right | 7.6 km || 
|-id=564 bgcolor=#d6d6d6
| 21564 Widmanstätten ||  ||  || August 26, 1998 || La Silla || E. W. Elst || — || align=right | 18 km || 
|-id=565 bgcolor=#d6d6d6
| 21565 ||  || — || August 26, 1998 || La Silla || E. W. Elst || — || align=right | 13 km || 
|-id=566 bgcolor=#d6d6d6
| 21566 ||  || — || August 26, 1998 || La Silla || E. W. Elst || KOR || align=right | 5.2 km || 
|-id=567 bgcolor=#E9E9E9
| 21567 ||  || — || September 1, 1998 || Woomera || F. B. Zoltowski || — || align=right | 2.6 km || 
|-id=568 bgcolor=#fefefe
| 21568 Evanmorikawa ||  ||  || September 14, 1998 || Socorro || LINEAR || — || align=right | 4.4 km || 
|-id=569 bgcolor=#d6d6d6
| 21569 ||  || — || September 14, 1998 || Kitt Peak || Spacewatch || THM || align=right | 8.4 km || 
|-id=570 bgcolor=#E9E9E9
| 21570 Muralidhar ||  ||  || September 14, 1998 || Socorro || LINEAR || EUN || align=right | 18 km || 
|-id=571 bgcolor=#E9E9E9
| 21571 Naegeli ||  ||  || September 14, 1998 || Socorro || LINEAR || — || align=right | 5.0 km || 
|-id=572 bgcolor=#E9E9E9
| 21572 Nguyen-McCarty ||  ||  || September 14, 1998 || Socorro || LINEAR || — || align=right | 4.0 km || 
|-id=573 bgcolor=#d6d6d6
| 21573 ||  || — || September 14, 1998 || Socorro || LINEAR || 7:4 || align=right | 14 km || 
|-id=574 bgcolor=#d6d6d6
| 21574 Ouzan ||  ||  || September 14, 1998 || Socorro || LINEAR || — || align=right | 5.3 km || 
|-id=575 bgcolor=#E9E9E9
| 21575 Padmanabhan ||  ||  || September 14, 1998 || Socorro || LINEAR || MRX || align=right | 5.0 km || 
|-id=576 bgcolor=#d6d6d6
| 21576 McGivney ||  ||  || September 19, 1998 || Needville || W. G. Dillon || THM || align=right | 8.9 km || 
|-id=577 bgcolor=#fefefe
| 21577 Negron ||  ||  || September 17, 1998 || Anderson Mesa || LONEOS || FLO || align=right | 3.2 km || 
|-id=578 bgcolor=#E9E9E9
| 21578 ||  || — || September 24, 1998 || Catalina || CSS || — || align=right | 17 km || 
|-id=579 bgcolor=#d6d6d6
| 21579 ||  || — || September 25, 1998 || Kitt Peak || Spacewatch || THM || align=right | 8.7 km || 
|-id=580 bgcolor=#d6d6d6
| 21580 Portalatin ||  ||  || September 17, 1998 || Anderson Mesa || LONEOS || KOR || align=right | 6.2 km || 
|-id=581 bgcolor=#d6d6d6
| 21581 Ernestoruiz ||  ||  || September 17, 1998 || Anderson Mesa || LONEOS || EOS || align=right | 13 km || 
|-id=582 bgcolor=#E9E9E9
| 21582 Arunvenkataraman ||  ||  || September 17, 1998 || Anderson Mesa || LONEOS || — || align=right | 4.7 km || 
|-id=583 bgcolor=#d6d6d6
| 21583 Caropietsch ||  ||  || September 26, 1998 || Socorro || LINEAR || HYG || align=right | 18 km || 
|-id=584 bgcolor=#d6d6d6
| 21584 Polepeddi ||  ||  || September 26, 1998 || Socorro || LINEAR || — || align=right | 8.8 km || 
|-id=585 bgcolor=#E9E9E9
| 21585 Polmear ||  ||  || September 26, 1998 || Socorro || LINEAR || — || align=right | 5.4 km || 
|-id=586 bgcolor=#d6d6d6
| 21586 Pourkaviani ||  ||  || September 26, 1998 || Socorro || LINEAR || THM || align=right | 17 km || 
|-id=587 bgcolor=#d6d6d6
| 21587 Christopynn ||  ||  || September 26, 1998 || Socorro || LINEAR || — || align=right | 21 km || 
|-id=588 bgcolor=#d6d6d6
| 21588 Gianelli ||  ||  || September 26, 1998 || Socorro || LINEAR || THM || align=right | 7.7 km || 
|-id=589 bgcolor=#E9E9E9
| 21589 Rafes ||  ||  || September 26, 1998 || Socorro || LINEAR || — || align=right | 5.3 km || 
|-id=590 bgcolor=#d6d6d6
| 21590 || 1998 TK || — || October 10, 1998 || Oizumi || T. Kobayashi || — || align=right | 7.9 km || 
|-id=591 bgcolor=#E9E9E9
| 21591 ||  || — || October 15, 1998 || Višnjan Observatory || K. Korlević || EUN || align=right | 5.3 km || 
|-id=592 bgcolor=#d6d6d6
| 21592 ||  || — || November 8, 1998 || Nachi-Katsuura || Y. Shimizu, T. Urata || — || align=right | 9.1 km || 
|-id=593 bgcolor=#C2FFFF
| 21593 ||  || — || November 10, 1998 || Socorro || LINEAR || L4 || align=right | 22 km || 
|-id=594 bgcolor=#E9E9E9
| 21594 ||  || — || November 13, 1998 || Višnjan Observatory || K. Korlević || CLO || align=right | 9.8 km || 
|-id=595 bgcolor=#C2FFFF
| 21595 ||  || — || November 18, 1998 || Catalina || CSS || L4 || align=right | 35 km || 
|-id=596 bgcolor=#fefefe
| 21596 ||  || — || November 23, 1998 || Oohira || T. Urata || ERI || align=right | 7.3 km || 
|-id=597 bgcolor=#d6d6d6
| 21597 ||  || — || November 18, 1998 || Kushiro || S. Ueda, H. Kaneda || EOS || align=right | 11 km || 
|-id=598 bgcolor=#fefefe
| 21598 ||  || — || November 28, 1998 || Višnjan Observatory || K. Korlević || EUT || align=right | 3.1 km || 
|-id=599 bgcolor=#C2FFFF
| 21599 ||  || — || November 21, 1998 || Socorro || LINEAR || L4 || align=right | 28 km || 
|-id=600 bgcolor=#d6d6d6
| 21600 ||  || — || December 7, 1998 || Višnjan Observatory || K. Korlević || EOS || align=right | 10 km || 
|}

21601–21700 

|-bgcolor=#C2FFFF
| 21601 ||  || — || December 15, 1998 || Socorro || LINEAR || L4 || align=right | 55 km || 
|-id=602 bgcolor=#C2FFFF
| 21602 Ialmenus ||  ||  || December 17, 1998 || Kleť || M. Tichý, Z. Moravec || L4 || align=right | 16 km || 
|-id=603 bgcolor=#E9E9E9
| 21603 || 1999 BY || — || January 17, 1999 || Catalina || CSS || — || align=right | 4.9 km || 
|-id=604 bgcolor=#d6d6d6
| 21604 ||  || — || January 19, 1999 || Višnjan Observatory || K. Korlević || KOR || align=right | 5.4 km || 
|-id=605 bgcolor=#d6d6d6
| 21605 Reynoso ||  ||  || February 12, 1999 || Socorro || LINEAR || — || align=right | 8.0 km || 
|-id=606 bgcolor=#fefefe
| 21606 ||  || — || March 17, 1999 || Caussols || ODAS || — || align=right | 2.6 km || 
|-id=607 bgcolor=#E9E9E9
| 21607 Robel ||  ||  || April 6, 1999 || Socorro || LINEAR || — || align=right | 9.3 km || 
|-id=608 bgcolor=#fefefe
| 21608 Gloyna ||  ||  || April 7, 1999 || Socorro || LINEAR || — || align=right | 3.0 km || 
|-id=609 bgcolor=#fefefe
| 21609 Williamcaleb ||  ||  || May 10, 1999 || Socorro || LINEAR || slow || align=right | 4.4 km || 
|-id=610 bgcolor=#E9E9E9
| 21610 Rosengard ||  ||  || May 10, 1999 || Socorro || LINEAR || — || align=right | 8.1 km || 
|-id=611 bgcolor=#E9E9E9
| 21611 Rosoff ||  ||  || May 10, 1999 || Socorro || LINEAR || EUN || align=right | 4.4 km || 
|-id=612 bgcolor=#fefefe
| 21612 Chelsagloria ||  ||  || May 10, 1999 || Socorro || LINEAR || V || align=right | 4.2 km || 
|-id=613 bgcolor=#fefefe
| 21613 Schlecht ||  ||  || May 12, 1999 || Socorro || LINEAR || — || align=right | 3.2 km || 
|-id=614 bgcolor=#fefefe
| 21614 Grochowski ||  ||  || May 10, 1999 || Socorro || LINEAR || — || align=right | 4.0 km || 
|-id=615 bgcolor=#fefefe
| 21615 Guardamano ||  ||  || May 10, 1999 || Socorro || LINEAR || — || align=right | 1.8 km || 
|-id=616 bgcolor=#fefefe
| 21616 Guhagilford ||  ||  || May 12, 1999 || Socorro || LINEAR || V || align=right | 2.6 km || 
|-id=617 bgcolor=#fefefe
| 21617 Johnhagen ||  ||  || May 13, 1999 || Socorro || LINEAR || — || align=right | 3.1 km || 
|-id=618 bgcolor=#fefefe
| 21618 Sheikh ||  ||  || May 13, 1999 || Socorro || LINEAR || — || align=right | 1.9 km || 
|-id=619 bgcolor=#fefefe
| 21619 Johnshopkins ||  ||  || May 9, 1999 || Anderson Mesa || LONEOS || — || align=right | 2.7 km || 
|-id=620 bgcolor=#E9E9E9
| 21620 || 1999 KU || — || May 16, 1999 || Catalina || CSS || — || align=right | 6.1 km || 
|-id=621 bgcolor=#fefefe
| 21621 Sherman ||  ||  || May 20, 1999 || Socorro || LINEAR || — || align=right | 8.1 km || 
|-id=622 bgcolor=#fefefe
| 21622 Victorshia ||  ||  || June 9, 1999 || Socorro || LINEAR || — || align=right | 2.7 km || 
|-id=623 bgcolor=#fefefe
| 21623 Albertshieh ||  ||  || June 9, 1999 || Socorro || LINEAR || — || align=right | 3.8 km || 
|-id=624 bgcolor=#E9E9E9
| 21624 ||  || — || July 11, 1999 || Višnjan Observatory || K. Korlević || — || align=right | 9.3 km || 
|-id=625 bgcolor=#d6d6d6
| 21625 Seira ||  ||  || July 12, 1999 || Socorro || LINEAR || TIR || align=right | 3.9 km || 
|-id=626 bgcolor=#fefefe
| 21626 Matthewhall ||  ||  || July 12, 1999 || Socorro || LINEAR || FLO || align=right | 3.2 km || 
|-id=627 bgcolor=#E9E9E9
| 21627 Sillis ||  ||  || July 13, 1999 || Socorro || LINEAR || — || align=right | 7.6 km || 
|-id=628 bgcolor=#fefefe
| 21628 Lucashof ||  ||  || July 13, 1999 || Socorro || LINEAR || MAS || align=right | 2.1 km || 
|-id=629 bgcolor=#fefefe
| 21629 Siperstein ||  ||  || July 13, 1999 || Socorro || LINEAR || — || align=right | 2.5 km || 
|-id=630 bgcolor=#fefefe
| 21630 Wootensmith ||  ||  || July 13, 1999 || Socorro || LINEAR || — || align=right | 3.0 km || 
|-id=631 bgcolor=#fefefe
| 21631 Stephenhonan ||  ||  || July 13, 1999 || Socorro || LINEAR || — || align=right | 2.7 km || 
|-id=632 bgcolor=#fefefe
| 21632 Suwanasri ||  ||  || July 13, 1999 || Socorro || LINEAR || — || align=right | 8.3 km || 
|-id=633 bgcolor=#fefefe
| 21633 Hsingpenyuan ||  ||  || July 13, 1999 || Socorro || LINEAR || V || align=right | 3.5 km || 
|-id=634 bgcolor=#fefefe
| 21634 Huangweikang ||  ||  || July 14, 1999 || Socorro || LINEAR || FLO || align=right | 3.3 km || 
|-id=635 bgcolor=#fefefe
| 21635 Micahtoll ||  ||  || July 14, 1999 || Socorro || LINEAR || NYS || align=right | 2.2 km || 
|-id=636 bgcolor=#fefefe
| 21636 Huertas ||  ||  || July 14, 1999 || Socorro || LINEAR || — || align=right | 3.3 km || 
|-id=637 bgcolor=#fefefe
| 21637 Ninahuffman ||  ||  || July 14, 1999 || Socorro || LINEAR || — || align=right | 2.4 km || 
|-id=638 bgcolor=#fefefe
| 21638 Nicjachowski ||  ||  || July 14, 1999 || Socorro || LINEAR || — || align=right | 2.4 km || 
|-id=639 bgcolor=#fefefe
| 21639 Davidkaufman ||  ||  || July 14, 1999 || Socorro || LINEAR || FLO || align=right | 5.8 km || 
|-id=640 bgcolor=#fefefe
| 21640 Petekirkland ||  ||  || July 14, 1999 || Socorro || LINEAR || FLO || align=right | 2.6 km || 
|-id=641 bgcolor=#E9E9E9
| 21641 Tiffanyko ||  ||  || July 14, 1999 || Socorro || LINEAR || — || align=right | 3.0 km || 
|-id=642 bgcolor=#fefefe
| 21642 Kominers ||  ||  || July 14, 1999 || Socorro || LINEAR || — || align=right | 2.4 km || 
|-id=643 bgcolor=#fefefe
| 21643 Kornev ||  ||  || July 14, 1999 || Socorro || LINEAR || — || align=right | 2.3 km || 
|-id=644 bgcolor=#fefefe
| 21644 Vinay ||  ||  || July 13, 1999 || Socorro || LINEAR || — || align=right | 3.1 km || 
|-id=645 bgcolor=#E9E9E9
| 21645 Chentsaiwei ||  ||  || July 14, 1999 || Socorro || LINEAR || — || align=right | 4.0 km || 
|-id=646 bgcolor=#E9E9E9
| 21646 Joshuaturner ||  ||  || July 12, 1999 || Socorro || LINEAR || EUN || align=right | 3.7 km || 
|-id=647 bgcolor=#E9E9E9
| 21647 Carlturner ||  ||  || July 12, 1999 || Socorro || LINEAR || — || align=right | 8.6 km || 
|-id=648 bgcolor=#E9E9E9
| 21648 Gravanschaik ||  ||  || July 12, 1999 || Socorro || LINEAR || MIT || align=right | 8.8 km || 
|-id=649 bgcolor=#E9E9E9
| 21649 Vardhana ||  ||  || July 13, 1999 || Socorro || LINEAR || — || align=right | 3.7 km || 
|-id=650 bgcolor=#fefefe
| 21650 Tilgner ||  ||  || July 17, 1999 || Gnosca || S. Sposetti || V || align=right | 2.2 km || 
|-id=651 bgcolor=#d6d6d6
| 21651 Mission Valley ||  ||  || July 19, 1999 || Farpoint || G. Bell || SAN || align=right | 3.6 km || 
|-id=652 bgcolor=#E9E9E9
| 21652 Vasishtha ||  ||  || July 22, 1999 || Socorro || LINEAR || — || align=right | 11 km || 
|-id=653 bgcolor=#E9E9E9
| 21653 Davidwang ||  ||  || July 22, 1999 || Socorro || LINEAR || TIN || align=right | 8.8 km || 
|-id=654 bgcolor=#fefefe
| 21654 || 1999 PZ || — || August 5, 1999 || Mallorca || Á. López J., R. Pacheco || — || align=right | 3.6 km || 
|-id=655 bgcolor=#E9E9E9
| 21655 Niklauswirth ||  ||  || August 8, 1999 || Ondřejov || L. Kotková || — || align=right | 6.6 km || 
|-id=656 bgcolor=#E9E9E9
| 21656 Knuth ||  ||  || August 9, 1999 || Ondřejov || P. Pravec, P. Kušnirák || — || align=right | 6.3 km || 
|-id=657 bgcolor=#fefefe
| 21657 ||  || — || August 10, 1999 || Reedy Creek || J. Broughton || V || align=right | 2.2 km || 
|-id=658 bgcolor=#fefefe
| 21658 ||  || — || August 10, 1999 || Reedy Creek || J. Broughton || — || align=right | 2.2 km || 
|-id=659 bgcolor=#E9E9E9
| 21659 Fredholm ||  ||  || August 13, 1999 || Prescott || P. G. Comba || — || align=right | 3.4 km || 
|-id=660 bgcolor=#E9E9E9
| 21660 Velenia ||  ||  || August 20, 1999 || Ondřejov || P. Pravec || PAD || align=right | 6.0 km || 
|-id=661 bgcolor=#fefefe
| 21661 Olgagermani || 1999 RA ||  || September 1, 1999 || Ceccano || G. Masi || ERI || align=right | 5.7 km || 
|-id=662 bgcolor=#E9E9E9
| 21662 Benigni || 1999 RC ||  || September 1, 1999 || Stroncone || Santa Lucia Obs. || EUN || align=right | 4.9 km || 
|-id=663 bgcolor=#d6d6d6
| 21663 Banat || 1999 RM ||  || September 3, 1999 || Starkenburg Observatory || Starkenburg Obs. || EMA || align=right | 11 km || 
|-id=664 bgcolor=#E9E9E9
| 21664 Konradzuse ||  ||  || September 4, 1999 || Ondřejov || L. Kotková || — || align=right | 4.2 km || 
|-id=665 bgcolor=#fefefe
| 21665 Frege ||  ||  || September 5, 1999 || Prescott || P. G. Comba || — || align=right | 2.2 km || 
|-id=666 bgcolor=#E9E9E9
| 21666 ||  || — || September 5, 1999 || Višnjan Observatory || K. Korlević || MIS || align=right | 7.3 km || 
|-id=667 bgcolor=#fefefe
| 21667 ||  || — || September 6, 1999 || Višnjan Observatory || K. Korlević || — || align=right | 2.9 km || 
|-id=668 bgcolor=#fefefe
| 21668 ||  || — || September 3, 1999 || Kitt Peak || Spacewatch || — || align=right | 5.9 km || 
|-id=669 bgcolor=#fefefe
| 21669 ||  || — || September 4, 1999 || Kitt Peak || Spacewatch || — || align=right | 2.4 km || 
|-id=670 bgcolor=#fefefe
| 21670 Kuan ||  ||  || September 7, 1999 || Socorro || LINEAR || — || align=right | 2.8 km || 
|-id=671 bgcolor=#E9E9E9
| 21671 Warrener ||  ||  || September 7, 1999 || Socorro || LINEAR || MAR || align=right | 4.2 km || 
|-id=672 bgcolor=#E9E9E9
| 21672 Laichunju ||  ||  || September 7, 1999 || Socorro || LINEAR || RAF || align=right | 3.8 km || 
|-id=673 bgcolor=#fefefe
| 21673 Leatherman ||  ||  || September 7, 1999 || Socorro || LINEAR || V || align=right | 2.2 km || 
|-id=674 bgcolor=#E9E9E9
| 21674 Renaldowebb ||  ||  || September 7, 1999 || Socorro || LINEAR || MAR || align=right | 4.1 km || 
|-id=675 bgcolor=#fefefe
| 21675 Kaitlinmaria ||  ||  || September 7, 1999 || Socorro || LINEAR || — || align=right | 2.6 km || 
|-id=676 bgcolor=#d6d6d6
| 21676 Maureenanne ||  ||  || September 7, 1999 || Socorro || LINEAR || — || align=right | 11 km || 
|-id=677 bgcolor=#E9E9E9
| 21677 Tylerlyon ||  ||  || September 7, 1999 || Socorro || LINEAR || — || align=right | 2.8 km || 
|-id=678 bgcolor=#E9E9E9
| 21678 Lindner ||  ||  || September 5, 1999 || Drebach || G. Lehmann, J. Kandler || — || align=right | 3.7 km || 
|-id=679 bgcolor=#fefefe
| 21679 Bettypalermiti ||  ||  || September 8, 1999 || Fountain Hills || C. W. Juels || — || align=right | 2.9 km || 
|-id=680 bgcolor=#E9E9E9
| 21680 Richardschwartz ||  ||  || September 9, 1999 || Farra d'Isonzo || Farra d'Isonzo || PAD || align=right | 6.5 km || 
|-id=681 bgcolor=#d6d6d6
| 21681 ||  || — || September 9, 1999 || Višnjan Observatory || K. Korlević || VER || align=right | 8.5 km || 
|-id=682 bgcolor=#fefefe
| 21682 Peštafrantišek ||  ||  || September 9, 1999 || Ondřejov || P. Pravec, P. Kušnirák || — || align=right | 3.5 km || 
|-id=683 bgcolor=#fefefe
| 21683 Segal ||  ||  || September 9, 1999 || Fountain Hills || C. W. Juels || FLO || align=right | 4.3 km || 
|-id=684 bgcolor=#fefefe
| 21684 Alinafiocca ||  ||  || September 4, 1999 || Anza || M. White, M. Collins || — || align=right | 2.7 km || 
|-id=685 bgcolor=#d6d6d6
| 21685 Francomallia ||  ||  || September 11, 1999 || Ceccano || G. Masi || KOR || align=right | 4.3 km || 
|-id=686 bgcolor=#fefefe
| 21686 Koschny ||  ||  || September 11, 1999 || Drebach || A. Knöfel || — || align=right | 1.8 km || 
|-id=687 bgcolor=#E9E9E9
| 21687 Filopanti ||  ||  || September 11, 1999 || Bologna || San Vittore Obs. || WIT || align=right | 4.0 km || 
|-id=688 bgcolor=#fefefe
| 21688 ||  || — || September 11, 1999 || Socorro || LINEAR || H || align=right | 9.2 km || 
|-id=689 bgcolor=#fefefe
| 21689 ||  || — || September 13, 1999 || Višnjan Observatory || K. Korlević || — || align=right | 5.5 km || 
|-id=690 bgcolor=#fefefe
| 21690 ||  || — || September 13, 1999 || Reedy Creek || J. Broughton || PHO || align=right | 4.9 km || 
|-id=691 bgcolor=#fefefe
| 21691 ||  || — || September 13, 1999 || Višnjan Observatory || K. Korlević || — || align=right | 3.2 km || 
|-id=692 bgcolor=#fefefe
| 21692 ||  || — || September 15, 1999 || Reedy Creek || J. Broughton || V || align=right | 3.1 km || 
|-id=693 bgcolor=#E9E9E9
| 21693 ||  || — || September 14, 1999 || Črni Vrh || Črni Vrh || — || align=right | 5.1 km || 
|-id=694 bgcolor=#E9E9E9
| 21694 Allisowilson ||  ||  || September 7, 1999 || Socorro || LINEAR || — || align=right | 3.2 km || 
|-id=695 bgcolor=#fefefe
| 21695 Hannahwolf ||  ||  || September 7, 1999 || Socorro || LINEAR || NYS || align=right | 2.2 km || 
|-id=696 bgcolor=#fefefe
| 21696 Ermalmquist ||  ||  || September 7, 1999 || Socorro || LINEAR || NYS || align=right | 6.4 km || 
|-id=697 bgcolor=#fefefe
| 21697 Mascharak ||  ||  || September 7, 1999 || Socorro || LINEAR || V || align=right | 2.0 km || 
|-id=698 bgcolor=#E9E9E9
| 21698 McCarron ||  ||  || September 7, 1999 || Socorro || LINEAR || — || align=right | 3.5 km || 
|-id=699 bgcolor=#d6d6d6
| 21699 Wolpert ||  ||  || September 7, 1999 || Socorro || LINEAR || THM || align=right | 10 km || 
|-id=700 bgcolor=#E9E9E9
| 21700 Caseynicole ||  ||  || September 7, 1999 || Socorro || LINEAR || — || align=right | 2.5 km || 
|}

21701–21800 

|-bgcolor=#d6d6d6
| 21701 Gabemendoza ||  ||  || September 7, 1999 || Socorro || LINEAR || KOR || align=right | 4.3 km || 
|-id=702 bgcolor=#fefefe
| 21702 Prisymendoza ||  ||  || September 7, 1999 || Socorro || LINEAR || — || align=right | 2.5 km || 
|-id=703 bgcolor=#fefefe
| 21703 Shravanimikk ||  ||  || September 7, 1999 || Socorro || LINEAR || — || align=right | 2.6 km || 
|-id=704 bgcolor=#d6d6d6
| 21704 Mikkilineni ||  ||  || September 7, 1999 || Socorro || LINEAR || — || align=right | 6.5 km || 
|-id=705 bgcolor=#E9E9E9
| 21705 Subinmin ||  ||  || September 7, 1999 || Socorro || LINEAR || HEN || align=right | 3.2 km || 
|-id=706 bgcolor=#d6d6d6
| 21706 Robminehart ||  ||  || September 7, 1999 || Socorro || LINEAR || THM || align=right | 9.5 km || 
|-id=707 bgcolor=#fefefe
| 21707 Johnmoore ||  ||  || September 7, 1999 || Socorro || LINEAR || FLO || align=right | 2.9 km || 
|-id=708 bgcolor=#E9E9E9
| 21708 Mulhall ||  ||  || September 7, 1999 || Socorro || LINEAR || — || align=right | 5.0 km || 
|-id=709 bgcolor=#fefefe
| 21709 Sethmurray ||  ||  || September 7, 1999 || Socorro || LINEAR || FLO || align=right | 4.3 km || 
|-id=710 bgcolor=#E9E9E9
| 21710 Nijhawan ||  ||  || September 7, 1999 || Socorro || LINEAR || AST || align=right | 6.5 km || 
|-id=711 bgcolor=#fefefe
| 21711 Wilfredwong ||  ||  || September 7, 1999 || Socorro || LINEAR || — || align=right | 4.0 km || 
|-id=712 bgcolor=#fefefe
| 21712 Obaid ||  ||  || September 7, 1999 || Socorro || LINEAR || — || align=right | 3.1 km || 
|-id=713 bgcolor=#fefefe
| 21713 Michaelolson ||  ||  || September 7, 1999 || Socorro || LINEAR || FLO || align=right | 2.0 km || 
|-id=714 bgcolor=#d6d6d6
| 21714 Geoffreywoo ||  ||  || September 8, 1999 || Socorro || LINEAR || — || align=right | 8.3 km || 
|-id=715 bgcolor=#fefefe
| 21715 Palaniappan ||  ||  || September 8, 1999 || Socorro || LINEAR || — || align=right | 4.1 km || 
|-id=716 bgcolor=#fefefe
| 21716 Panchamia ||  ||  || September 9, 1999 || Socorro || LINEAR || — || align=right | 2.0 km || 
|-id=717 bgcolor=#d6d6d6
| 21717 Pang ||  ||  || September 9, 1999 || Socorro || LINEAR || KOR || align=right | 4.6 km || 
|-id=718 bgcolor=#E9E9E9
| 21718 Cheonghapark ||  ||  || September 9, 1999 || Socorro || LINEAR || — || align=right | 3.8 km || 
|-id=719 bgcolor=#fefefe
| 21719 Pasricha ||  ||  || September 9, 1999 || Socorro || LINEAR || — || align=right | 4.3 km || 
|-id=720 bgcolor=#fefefe
| 21720 Pilishvili ||  ||  || September 9, 1999 || Socorro || LINEAR || — || align=right | 3.2 km || 
|-id=721 bgcolor=#fefefe
| 21721 Feiniqu ||  ||  || September 9, 1999 || Socorro || LINEAR || V || align=right | 1.9 km || 
|-id=722 bgcolor=#fefefe
| 21722 Rambhia ||  ||  || September 9, 1999 || Socorro || LINEAR || V || align=right | 2.3 km || 
|-id=723 bgcolor=#E9E9E9
| 21723 Yinyinwu ||  ||  || September 9, 1999 || Socorro || LINEAR || slow || align=right | 8.2 km || 
|-id=724 bgcolor=#fefefe
| 21724 Ratai ||  ||  || September 9, 1999 || Socorro || LINEAR || V || align=right | 2.1 km || 
|-id=725 bgcolor=#d6d6d6
| 21725 Zhongyuechen ||  ||  || September 9, 1999 || Socorro || LINEAR || EOS || align=right | 6.3 km || 
|-id=726 bgcolor=#fefefe
| 21726 Rezvanian ||  ||  || September 9, 1999 || Socorro || LINEAR || — || align=right | 4.0 km || 
|-id=727 bgcolor=#fefefe
| 21727 Rhines ||  ||  || September 9, 1999 || Socorro || LINEAR || — || align=right | 2.1 km || 
|-id=728 bgcolor=#E9E9E9
| 21728 Zhuzhirui ||  ||  || September 9, 1999 || Socorro || LINEAR || MAR || align=right | 3.3 km || 
|-id=729 bgcolor=#fefefe
| 21729 Kimrichards ||  ||  || September 9, 1999 || Socorro || LINEAR || — || align=right | 2.4 km || 
|-id=730 bgcolor=#fefefe
| 21730 Ignaciorod ||  ||  || September 9, 1999 || Socorro || LINEAR || — || align=right | 2.4 km || 
|-id=731 bgcolor=#E9E9E9
| 21731 Zhuruochen ||  ||  || September 9, 1999 || Socorro || LINEAR || — || align=right | 5.2 km || 
|-id=732 bgcolor=#E9E9E9
| 21732 Rumery ||  ||  || September 9, 1999 || Socorro || LINEAR || — || align=right | 3.9 km || 
|-id=733 bgcolor=#fefefe
| 21733 Schlottmann ||  ||  || September 9, 1999 || Socorro || LINEAR || — || align=right | 2.4 km || 
|-id=734 bgcolor=#d6d6d6
| 21734 ||  || — || September 9, 1999 || Socorro || LINEAR || EOS || align=right | 6.9 km || 
|-id=735 bgcolor=#fefefe
| 21735 Nissaschmidt ||  ||  || September 9, 1999 || Socorro || LINEAR || V || align=right | 3.0 km || 
|-id=736 bgcolor=#fefefe
| 21736 Samaschneid ||  ||  || September 9, 1999 || Socorro || LINEAR || NYS || align=right | 6.0 km || 
|-id=737 bgcolor=#fefefe
| 21737 Stephenshulz ||  ||  || September 9, 1999 || Socorro || LINEAR || — || align=right | 6.4 km || 
|-id=738 bgcolor=#fefefe
| 21738 Schwank ||  ||  || September 9, 1999 || Socorro || LINEAR || V || align=right | 2.2 km || 
|-id=739 bgcolor=#fefefe
| 21739 Annekeschwob ||  ||  || September 9, 1999 || Socorro || LINEAR || — || align=right | 2.2 km || 
|-id=740 bgcolor=#E9E9E9
| 21740 ||  || — || September 9, 1999 || Socorro || LINEAR || ADE || align=right | 7.1 km || 
|-id=741 bgcolor=#d6d6d6
| 21741 ||  || — || September 9, 1999 || Socorro || LINEAR || — || align=right | 5.4 km || 
|-id=742 bgcolor=#E9E9E9
| 21742 Rachaelscott ||  ||  || September 9, 1999 || Socorro || LINEAR || MRX || align=right | 2.9 km || 
|-id=743 bgcolor=#E9E9E9
| 21743 Michaelsegal ||  ||  || September 9, 1999 || Socorro || LINEAR || — || align=right | 6.3 km || 
|-id=744 bgcolor=#fefefe
| 21744 Meliselinger ||  ||  || September 9, 1999 || Socorro || LINEAR || NYS || align=right | 2.8 km || 
|-id=745 bgcolor=#E9E9E9
| 21745 Shadfan ||  ||  || September 9, 1999 || Socorro || LINEAR || — || align=right | 3.5 km || 
|-id=746 bgcolor=#fefefe
| 21746 Carrieshaw ||  ||  || September 9, 1999 || Socorro || LINEAR || — || align=right | 1.8 km || 
|-id=747 bgcolor=#E9E9E9
| 21747 Justsolomon ||  ||  || September 9, 1999 || Socorro || LINEAR || — || align=right | 5.9 km || 
|-id=748 bgcolor=#fefefe
| 21748 Srinivasan ||  ||  || September 9, 1999 || Socorro || LINEAR || — || align=right | 2.3 km || 
|-id=749 bgcolor=#E9E9E9
| 21749 ||  || — || September 9, 1999 || Socorro || LINEAR || — || align=right | 5.0 km || 
|-id=750 bgcolor=#fefefe
| 21750 Tartakahashi ||  ||  || September 9, 1999 || Socorro || LINEAR || FLO || align=right | 1.8 km || 
|-id=751 bgcolor=#fefefe
| 21751 Jennytaylor ||  ||  || September 9, 1999 || Socorro || LINEAR || NYS || align=right | 2.0 km || 
|-id=752 bgcolor=#fefefe
| 21752 Johnthurmon ||  ||  || September 9, 1999 || Socorro || LINEAR || FLO || align=right | 3.0 km || 
|-id=753 bgcolor=#fefefe
| 21753 Trudel ||  ||  || September 9, 1999 || Socorro || LINEAR || — || align=right | 3.8 km || 
|-id=754 bgcolor=#fefefe
| 21754 Tvaruzkova ||  ||  || September 9, 1999 || Socorro || LINEAR || — || align=right | 1.9 km || 
|-id=755 bgcolor=#E9E9E9
| 21755 ||  || — || September 10, 1999 || Socorro || LINEAR || — || align=right | 4.9 km || 
|-id=756 bgcolor=#fefefe
| 21756 ||  || — || September 13, 1999 || Socorro || LINEAR || — || align=right | 2.2 km || 
|-id=757 bgcolor=#d6d6d6
| 21757 ||  || — || September 7, 1999 || Socorro || LINEAR || — || align=right | 14 km || 
|-id=758 bgcolor=#fefefe
| 21758 Adrianveres ||  ||  || September 8, 1999 || Socorro || LINEAR || V || align=right | 2.8 km || 
|-id=759 bgcolor=#fefefe
| 21759 ||  || — || September 8, 1999 || Socorro || LINEAR || — || align=right | 3.0 km || 
|-id=760 bgcolor=#fefefe
| 21760 ||  || — || September 8, 1999 || Socorro || LINEAR || CHL || align=right | 9.1 km || 
|-id=761 bgcolor=#E9E9E9
| 21761 ||  || — || September 8, 1999 || Socorro || LINEAR || EUN || align=right | 3.1 km || 
|-id=762 bgcolor=#E9E9E9
| 21762 ||  || — || September 8, 1999 || Socorro || LINEAR || — || align=right | 3.9 km || 
|-id=763 bgcolor=#E9E9E9
| 21763 ||  || — || September 8, 1999 || Socorro || LINEAR || — || align=right | 5.8 km || 
|-id=764 bgcolor=#E9E9E9
| 21764 ||  || — || September 8, 1999 || Socorro || LINEAR || — || align=right | 4.5 km || 
|-id=765 bgcolor=#E9E9E9
| 21765 ||  || — || September 8, 1999 || Socorro || LINEAR || — || align=right | 7.4 km || 
|-id=766 bgcolor=#E9E9E9
| 21766 ||  || — || September 8, 1999 || Socorro || LINEAR || — || align=right | 18 km || 
|-id=767 bgcolor=#d6d6d6
| 21767 ||  || — || September 8, 1999 || Socorro || LINEAR || — || align=right | 5.3 km || 
|-id=768 bgcolor=#E9E9E9
| 21768 ||  || — || September 8, 1999 || Socorro || LINEAR || — || align=right | 12 km || 
|-id=769 bgcolor=#E9E9E9
| 21769 ||  || — || September 8, 1999 || Socorro || LINEAR || MAR || align=right | 2.4 km || 
|-id=770 bgcolor=#fefefe
| 21770 Wangyiran ||  ||  || September 8, 1999 || Socorro || LINEAR || — || align=right | 3.7 km || 
|-id=771 bgcolor=#E9E9E9
| 21771 ||  || — || September 8, 1999 || Socorro || LINEAR || — || align=right | 7.3 km || 
|-id=772 bgcolor=#d6d6d6
| 21772 ||  || — || September 8, 1999 || Socorro || LINEAR || — || align=right | 14 km || 
|-id=773 bgcolor=#E9E9E9
| 21773 ||  || — || September 7, 1999 || Socorro || LINEAR || CLO || align=right | 4.2 km || 
|-id=774 bgcolor=#fefefe
| 21774 O'Brien ||  ||  || September 3, 1999 || Anderson Mesa || LONEOS || V || align=right | 1.7 km || 
|-id=775 bgcolor=#fefefe
| 21775 Tsiganis ||  ||  || September 5, 1999 || Anderson Mesa || LONEOS || — || align=right | 3.1 km || 
|-id=776 bgcolor=#E9E9E9
| 21776 Kryszczyńska ||  ||  || September 5, 1999 || Anderson Mesa || LONEOS || — || align=right | 3.5 km || 
|-id=777 bgcolor=#d6d6d6
| 21777 ||  || — || September 5, 1999 || Catalina || CSS || EOS || align=right | 6.0 km || 
|-id=778 bgcolor=#fefefe
| 21778 Andrewarren ||  ||  || September 7, 1999 || Socorro || LINEAR || MAS || align=right | 2.9 km || 
|-id=779 bgcolor=#E9E9E9
| 21779 ||  || — || September 8, 1999 || Catalina || CSS || — || align=right | 3.1 km || 
|-id=780 bgcolor=#fefefe
| 21780 ||  || — || September 8, 1999 || Catalina || CSS || — || align=right | 3.3 km || 
|-id=781 bgcolor=#fefefe
| 21781 ||  || — || September 8, 1999 || Catalina || CSS || — || align=right | 2.2 km || 
|-id=782 bgcolor=#fefefe
| 21782 Davemcdonald ||  ||  || September 8, 1999 || Anderson Mesa || LONEOS || FLO || align=right | 2.3 km || 
|-id=783 bgcolor=#E9E9E9
| 21783 ||  || — || September 7, 1999 || Kitt Peak || Spacewatch || — || align=right | 3.4 km || 
|-id=784 bgcolor=#E9E9E9
| 21784 ||  || — || September 17, 1999 || Višnjan Observatory || K. Korlević || — || align=right | 5.6 km || 
|-id=785 bgcolor=#E9E9E9
| 21785 Méchain ||  ||  || September 21, 1999 || Kleť || M. Tichý || — || align=right | 4.5 km || 
|-id=786 bgcolor=#d6d6d6
| 21786 ||  || — || September 29, 1999 || Višnjan Observatory || K. Korlević || — || align=right | 12 km || 
|-id=787 bgcolor=#E9E9E9
| 21787 ||  || — || September 29, 1999 || Višnjan Observatory || K. Korlević || EUN || align=right | 6.2 km || 
|-id=788 bgcolor=#FA8072
| 21788 ||  || — || September 30, 1999 || Socorro || LINEAR || PHO || align=right | 3.3 km || 
|-id=789 bgcolor=#fefefe
| 21789 Frankwasser ||  ||  || September 29, 1999 || Socorro || LINEAR || FLO || align=right | 3.3 km || 
|-id=790 bgcolor=#d6d6d6
| 21790 ||  || — || September 29, 1999 || Socorro || LINEAR || — || align=right | 10 km || 
|-id=791 bgcolor=#fefefe
| 21791 Mattweegman ||  ||  || September 29, 1999 || Socorro || LINEAR || V || align=right | 3.4 km || 
|-id=792 bgcolor=#d6d6d6
| 21792 ||  || — || September 29, 1999 || Socorro || LINEAR || — || align=right | 14 km || 
|-id=793 bgcolor=#d6d6d6
| 21793 ||  || — || September 29, 1999 || Socorro || LINEAR || EMA || align=right | 11 km || 
|-id=794 bgcolor=#E9E9E9
| 21794 ||  || — || September 29, 1999 || Socorro || LINEAR || EUN || align=right | 4.9 km || 
|-id=795 bgcolor=#fefefe
| 21795 Masi ||  ||  || September 29, 1999 || Campo Catino || F. Mallia || NYS || align=right | 3.2 km || 
|-id=796 bgcolor=#E9E9E9
| 21796 ||  || — || September 30, 1999 || Catalina || CSS || — || align=right | 6.0 km || 
|-id=797 bgcolor=#fefefe
| 21797 ||  || — || September 30, 1999 || Catalina || CSS || — || align=right | 4.0 km || 
|-id=798 bgcolor=#fefefe
| 21798 Mitchweegman ||  ||  || September 30, 1999 || Socorro || LINEAR || FLO || align=right | 2.9 km || 
|-id=799 bgcolor=#d6d6d6
| 21799 Ciociaria || 1999 TP ||  || October 1, 1999 || Campo Catino || F. Mallia, G. Masi || — || align=right | 9.5 km || 
|-id=800 bgcolor=#fefefe
| 21800 ||  || — || October 1, 1999 || Višnjan Observatory || K. Korlević || — || align=right | 3.1 km || 
|}

21801–21900 

|-bgcolor=#fefefe
| 21801 Ančerl ||  ||  || October 2, 1999 || Ondřejov || L. Kotková || — || align=right | 4.1 km || 
|-id=802 bgcolor=#E9E9E9
| 21802 Svoreň ||  ||  || October 6, 1999 || Modra || L. Kornoš, J. Tóth || — || align=right | 3.3 km || 
|-id=803 bgcolor=#fefefe
| 21803 ||  || — || October 6, 1999 || Višnjan Observatory || K. Korlević, M. Jurić || V || align=right | 3.8 km || 
|-id=804 bgcolor=#d6d6d6
| 21804 Václavneumann ||  ||  || October 4, 1999 || Ondřejov || L. Kotková || 3:2 || align=right | 9.6 km || 
|-id=805 bgcolor=#d6d6d6
| 21805 ||  || — || October 8, 1999 || Višnjan Observatory || K. Korlević, M. Jurić || THMslow || align=right | 8.2 km || 
|-id=806 bgcolor=#fefefe
| 21806 ||  || — || October 10, 1999 || Višnjan Observatory || K. Korlević, M. Jurić || EUT || align=right | 2.6 km || 
|-id=807 bgcolor=#d6d6d6
| 21807 ||  || — || October 10, 1999 || Višnjan Observatory || K. Korlević, M. Jurić || — || align=right | 9.9 km || 
|-id=808 bgcolor=#d6d6d6
| 21808 ||  || — || October 14, 1999 || Xinglong || SCAP || KOR || align=right | 5.7 km || 
|-id=809 bgcolor=#E9E9E9
| 21809 ||  || — || October 15, 1999 || High Point || D. K. Chesney || — || align=right | 4.7 km || 
|-id=810 bgcolor=#E9E9E9
| 21810 ||  || — || October 9, 1999 || Uto || F. Uto || — || align=right | 3.7 km || 
|-id=811 bgcolor=#d6d6d6
| 21811 Burroughs ||  ||  || October 5, 1999 || Goodricke-Pigott || R. A. Tucker || HYG || align=right | 8.4 km || 
|-id=812 bgcolor=#d6d6d6
| 21812 ||  || — || October 3, 1999 || Kitt Peak || Spacewatch || KOR || align=right | 3.3 km || 
|-id=813 bgcolor=#fefefe
| 21813 Danwinegar ||  ||  || October 3, 1999 || Socorro || LINEAR || — || align=right | 6.0 km || 
|-id=814 bgcolor=#fefefe
| 21814 Shanawolff ||  ||  || October 3, 1999 || Socorro || LINEAR || FLO || align=right | 3.9 km || 
|-id=815 bgcolor=#fefefe
| 21815 Fanyang ||  ||  || October 4, 1999 || Socorro || LINEAR || — || align=right | 4.4 km || 
|-id=816 bgcolor=#E9E9E9
| 21816 ||  || — || October 4, 1999 || Socorro || LINEAR || MAR || align=right | 4.6 km || 
|-id=817 bgcolor=#E9E9E9
| 21817 Yingling ||  ||  || October 4, 1999 || Socorro || LINEAR || — || align=right | 8.0 km || 
|-id=818 bgcolor=#d6d6d6
| 21818 Yurkanin ||  ||  || October 4, 1999 || Socorro || LINEAR || — || align=right | 8.3 km || 
|-id=819 bgcolor=#d6d6d6
| 21819 ||  || — || October 4, 1999 || Socorro || LINEAR || — || align=right | 9.8 km || 
|-id=820 bgcolor=#fefefe
| 21820 ||  || — || October 2, 1999 || Socorro || LINEAR || — || align=right | 4.1 km || 
|-id=821 bgcolor=#d6d6d6
| 21821 Billryan ||  ||  || October 12, 1999 || Anderson Mesa || LONEOS || KOR || align=right | 3.9 km || 
|-id=822 bgcolor=#E9E9E9
| 21822 Degiorgi ||  ||  || October 15, 1999 || Anderson Mesa || LONEOS || — || align=right | 4.0 km || 
|-id=823 bgcolor=#fefefe
| 21823 ||  || — || October 9, 1999 || Kitt Peak || Spacewatch || NYS || align=right | 2.8 km || 
|-id=824 bgcolor=#E9E9E9
| 21824 ||  || — || October 10, 1999 || Kitt Peak || Spacewatch || — || align=right | 2.9 km || 
|-id=825 bgcolor=#fefefe
| 21825 Zhangyizhong ||  ||  || October 2, 1999 || Socorro || LINEAR || — || align=right | 5.8 km || 
|-id=826 bgcolor=#fefefe
| 21826 Youjiazhong ||  ||  || October 2, 1999 || Socorro || LINEAR || — || align=right | 2.4 km || 
|-id=827 bgcolor=#fefefe
| 21827 Chingzhu ||  ||  || October 2, 1999 || Socorro || LINEAR || — || align=right | 2.9 km || 
|-id=828 bgcolor=#d6d6d6
| 21828 ||  || — || October 2, 1999 || Socorro || LINEAR || — || align=right | 8.2 km || 
|-id=829 bgcolor=#fefefe
| 21829 Kaylacornale ||  ||  || October 2, 1999 || Socorro || LINEAR || FLO || align=right | 2.8 km || 
|-id=830 bgcolor=#d6d6d6
| 21830 ||  || — || October 2, 1999 || Socorro || LINEAR || — || align=right | 6.5 km || 
|-id=831 bgcolor=#E9E9E9
| 21831 ||  || — || October 2, 1999 || Socorro || LINEAR || — || align=right | 14 km || 
|-id=832 bgcolor=#E9E9E9
| 21832 ||  || — || October 2, 1999 || Socorro || LINEAR || — || align=right | 2.8 km || 
|-id=833 bgcolor=#fefefe
| 21833 ||  || — || October 2, 1999 || Socorro || LINEAR || V || align=right | 2.0 km || 
|-id=834 bgcolor=#fefefe
| 21834 ||  || — || October 2, 1999 || Socorro || LINEAR || FLO || align=right | 2.4 km || 
|-id=835 bgcolor=#d6d6d6
| 21835 ||  || — || October 2, 1999 || Socorro || LINEAR || HYG || align=right | 9.5 km || 
|-id=836 bgcolor=#d6d6d6
| 21836 ||  || — || October 2, 1999 || Socorro || LINEAR || EOS || align=right | 7.9 km || 
|-id=837 bgcolor=#fefefe
| 21837 ||  || — || October 2, 1999 || Socorro || LINEAR || V || align=right | 2.6 km || 
|-id=838 bgcolor=#E9E9E9
| 21838 ||  || — || October 2, 1999 || Socorro || LINEAR || GEF || align=right | 4.0 km || 
|-id=839 bgcolor=#d6d6d6
| 21839 ||  || — || October 2, 1999 || Socorro || LINEAR || KOR || align=right | 4.5 km || 
|-id=840 bgcolor=#fefefe
| 21840 Ghoshchoudhury ||  ||  || October 2, 1999 || Socorro || LINEAR || V || align=right | 2.3 km || 
|-id=841 bgcolor=#d6d6d6
| 21841 ||  || — || October 2, 1999 || Socorro || LINEAR || EOS || align=right | 6.6 km || 
|-id=842 bgcolor=#d6d6d6
| 21842 ||  || — || October 2, 1999 || Socorro || LINEAR || — || align=right | 10 km || 
|-id=843 bgcolor=#fefefe
| 21843 ||  || — || October 3, 1999 || Socorro || LINEAR || NYS || align=right | 2.2 km || 
|-id=844 bgcolor=#d6d6d6
| 21844 ||  || — || October 4, 1999 || Socorro || LINEAR || — || align=right | 9.3 km || 
|-id=845 bgcolor=#fefefe
| 21845 ||  || — || October 4, 1999 || Socorro || LINEAR || V || align=right | 2.9 km || 
|-id=846 bgcolor=#fefefe
| 21846 Wojakowski ||  ||  || October 4, 1999 || Socorro || LINEAR || — || align=right | 5.2 km || 
|-id=847 bgcolor=#E9E9E9
| 21847 ||  || — || October 4, 1999 || Socorro || LINEAR || DOR || align=right | 9.6 km || 
|-id=848 bgcolor=#E9E9E9
| 21848 ||  || — || October 4, 1999 || Socorro || LINEAR || — || align=right | 3.9 km || 
|-id=849 bgcolor=#fefefe
| 21849 ||  || — || October 6, 1999 || Socorro || LINEAR || — || align=right | 2.2 km || 
|-id=850 bgcolor=#E9E9E9
| 21850 Abshir ||  ||  || October 7, 1999 || Socorro || LINEAR || — || align=right | 3.8 km || 
|-id=851 bgcolor=#fefefe
| 21851 ||  || — || October 7, 1999 || Socorro || LINEAR || NYS || align=right | 5.9 km || 
|-id=852 bgcolor=#fefefe
| 21852 Bolander ||  ||  || October 7, 1999 || Socorro || LINEAR || — || align=right | 5.9 km || 
|-id=853 bgcolor=#d6d6d6
| 21853 Kelseykay ||  ||  || October 7, 1999 || Socorro || LINEAR || — || align=right | 7.5 km || 
|-id=854 bgcolor=#E9E9E9
| 21854 Brendandwyer ||  ||  || October 7, 1999 || Socorro || LINEAR || — || align=right | 3.7 km || 
|-id=855 bgcolor=#d6d6d6
| 21855 ||  || — || October 7, 1999 || Socorro || LINEAR || THM || align=right | 11 km || 
|-id=856 bgcolor=#fefefe
| 21856 Heathermaria ||  ||  || October 7, 1999 || Socorro || LINEAR || FLO || align=right | 2.0 km || 
|-id=857 bgcolor=#d6d6d6
| 21857 ||  || — || October 7, 1999 || Socorro || LINEAR || KOR || align=right | 4.9 km || 
|-id=858 bgcolor=#d6d6d6
| 21858 Gosal ||  ||  || October 7, 1999 || Socorro || LINEAR || KOR || align=right | 6.2 km || 
|-id=859 bgcolor=#E9E9E9
| 21859 ||  || — || October 10, 1999 || Socorro || LINEAR || — || align=right | 3.9 km || 
|-id=860 bgcolor=#E9E9E9
| 21860 Joannaguy ||  ||  || October 10, 1999 || Socorro || LINEAR || — || align=right | 4.8 km || 
|-id=861 bgcolor=#d6d6d6
| 21861 Maryhedberg ||  ||  || October 12, 1999 || Socorro || LINEAR || EOS || align=right | 5.0 km || 
|-id=862 bgcolor=#d6d6d6
| 21862 Joshuajones ||  ||  || October 12, 1999 || Socorro || LINEAR || EOS || align=right | 5.0 km || 
|-id=863 bgcolor=#d6d6d6
| 21863 ||  || — || October 12, 1999 || Socorro || LINEAR || — || align=right | 12 km || 
|-id=864 bgcolor=#fefefe
| 21864 ||  || — || October 4, 1999 || Catalina || CSS || — || align=right | 2.6 km || 
|-id=865 bgcolor=#E9E9E9
| 21865 ||  || — || October 8, 1999 || Catalina || CSS || EUN || align=right | 5.2 km || 
|-id=866 bgcolor=#E9E9E9
| 21866 ||  || — || October 8, 1999 || Catalina || CSS || — || align=right | 2.3 km || 
|-id=867 bgcolor=#d6d6d6
| 21867 ||  || — || October 9, 1999 || Socorro || LINEAR || 7:4 || align=right | 15 km || 
|-id=868 bgcolor=#E9E9E9
| 21868 ||  || — || October 10, 1999 || Socorro || LINEAR || — || align=right | 9.2 km || 
|-id=869 bgcolor=#E9E9E9
| 21869 ||  || — || October 1, 1999 || Catalina || CSS || — || align=right | 7.0 km || 
|-id=870 bgcolor=#fefefe
| 21870 ||  || — || October 16, 1999 || Višnjan Observatory || K. Korlević || — || align=right | 3.2 km || 
|-id=871 bgcolor=#fefefe
| 21871 ||  || — || October 17, 1999 || Višnjan Observatory || K. Korlević || FLO || align=right | 3.5 km || 
|-id=872 bgcolor=#E9E9E9
| 21872 ||  || — || October 18, 1999 || Xinglong || SCAP || — || align=right | 4.6 km || 
|-id=873 bgcolor=#d6d6d6
| 21873 Jindřichůvhradec ||  ||  || October 29, 1999 || Kleť || J. Tichá, M. Tichý || HYG || align=right | 7.2 km || 
|-id=874 bgcolor=#fefefe
| 21874 ||  || — || October 18, 1999 || Xinglong || SCAP || NYS || align=right | 3.5 km || 
|-id=875 bgcolor=#d6d6d6
| 21875 ||  || — || October 22, 1999 || Xinglong || SCAP || — || align=right | 9.5 km || 
|-id=876 bgcolor=#fefefe
| 21876 ||  || — || October 29, 1999 || Catalina || CSS || — || align=right | 5.4 km || 
|-id=877 bgcolor=#fefefe
| 21877 ||  || — || October 31, 1999 || Kitt Peak || Spacewatch || NYS || align=right | 1.4 km || 
|-id=878 bgcolor=#d6d6d6
| 21878 ||  || — || October 29, 1999 || Catalina || CSS || EOS || align=right | 9.8 km || 
|-id=879 bgcolor=#E9E9E9
| 21879 ||  || — || October 29, 1999 || Catalina || CSS || — || align=right | 3.4 km || 
|-id=880 bgcolor=#E9E9E9
| 21880 ||  || — || October 29, 1999 || Catalina || CSS || — || align=right | 3.9 km || 
|-id=881 bgcolor=#E9E9E9
| 21881 ||  || — || October 29, 1999 || Catalina || CSS || — || align=right | 3.8 km || 
|-id=882 bgcolor=#fefefe
| 21882 ||  || — || October 29, 1999 || Catalina || CSS || NYS || align=right | 2.1 km || 
|-id=883 bgcolor=#fefefe
| 21883 ||  || — || October 28, 1999 || Catalina || CSS || V || align=right | 2.8 km || 
|-id=884 bgcolor=#E9E9E9
| 21884 ||  || — || October 30, 1999 || Catalina || CSS || — || align=right | 3.7 km || 
|-id=885 bgcolor=#d6d6d6
| 21885 ||  || — || October 30, 1999 || Kitt Peak || Spacewatch || CRO || align=right | 8.8 km || 
|-id=886 bgcolor=#E9E9E9
| 21886 ||  || — || October 31, 1999 || Kitt Peak || Spacewatch || MIS || align=right | 4.4 km || 
|-id=887 bgcolor=#d6d6d6
| 21887 Dipippo ||  ||  || October 20, 1999 || Anderson Mesa || LONEOS || EOS || align=right | 7.6 km || 
|-id=888 bgcolor=#d6d6d6
| 21888 Ďurech ||  ||  || October 29, 1999 || Anderson Mesa || LONEOS || — || align=right | 13 km || 
|-id=889 bgcolor=#E9E9E9
| 21889 ||  || — || October 29, 1999 || Kitt Peak || Spacewatch || — || align=right | 7.4 km || 
|-id=890 bgcolor=#d6d6d6
| 21890 ||  || — || October 30, 1999 || Catalina || CSS || EOS || align=right | 5.4 km || 
|-id=891 bgcolor=#fefefe
| 21891 Andreabocelli ||  ||  || November 1, 1999 || Monte Agliale || S. Donati || V || align=right | 2.9 km || 
|-id=892 bgcolor=#d6d6d6
| 21892 ||  || — || November 1, 1999 || Kitt Peak || Spacewatch || THM || align=right | 8.4 km || 
|-id=893 bgcolor=#FA8072
| 21893 ||  || — || November 1, 1999 || Catalina || CSS || — || align=right | 3.5 km || 
|-id=894 bgcolor=#E9E9E9
| 21894 ||  || — || November 1, 1999 || Catalina || CSS || MAR || align=right | 4.4 km || 
|-id=895 bgcolor=#d6d6d6
| 21895 ||  || — || November 5, 1999 || Višnjan Observatory || K. Korlević || — || align=right | 11 km || 
|-id=896 bgcolor=#d6d6d6
| 21896 ||  || — || November 7, 1999 || Oohira || T. Urata || HYG || align=right | 8.1 km || 
|-id=897 bgcolor=#E9E9E9
| 21897 ||  || — || November 7, 1999 || Višnjan Observatory || K. Korlević || AST || align=right | 6.7 km || 
|-id=898 bgcolor=#d6d6d6
| 21898 ||  || — || November 7, 1999 || Višnjan Observatory || K. Korlević || — || align=right | 13 km || 
|-id=899 bgcolor=#d6d6d6
| 21899 ||  || — || November 8, 1999 || Fountain Hills || C. W. Juels || — || align=right | 5.4 km || 
|-id=900 bgcolor=#C2FFFF
| 21900 Orus ||  ||  || November 9, 1999 || Oizumi || T. Kobayashi || L4 || align=right | 51 km || 
|}

21901–22000 

|-bgcolor=#E9E9E9
| 21901 ||  || — || November 10, 1999 || Fountain Hills || C. W. Juels || — || align=right | 6.4 km || 
|-id=902 bgcolor=#d6d6d6
| 21902 ||  || — || November 10, 1999 || Fountain Hills || C. W. Juels || — || align=right | 11 km || 
|-id=903 bgcolor=#d6d6d6
| 21903 Wallace ||  ||  || November 10, 1999 || Fountain Hills || C. W. Juels || EOS || align=right | 11 km || 
|-id=904 bgcolor=#d6d6d6
| 21904 ||  || — || November 11, 1999 || Fountain Hills || C. W. Juels || — || align=right | 15 km || 
|-id=905 bgcolor=#fefefe
| 21905 ||  || — || November 2, 1999 || Kitt Peak || Spacewatch || NYS || align=right | 1.7 km || 
|-id=906 bgcolor=#E9E9E9
| 21906 ||  || — || November 11, 1999 || Fountain Hills || C. W. Juels || — || align=right | 5.2 km || 
|-id=907 bgcolor=#E9E9E9
| 21907 ||  || — || November 11, 1999 || Fountain Hills || C. W. Juels || EUN || align=right | 6.6 km || 
|-id=908 bgcolor=#fefefe
| 21908 ||  || — || November 12, 1999 || Višnjan Observatory || K. Korlević || NYS || align=right | 2.2 km || 
|-id=909 bgcolor=#E9E9E9
| 21909 ||  || — || November 12, 1999 || Višnjan Observatory || K. Korlević || RAF || align=right | 4.4 km || 
|-id=910 bgcolor=#fefefe
| 21910 ||  || — || November 14, 1999 || Fountain Hills || C. W. Juels || FLO || align=right | 5.7 km || 
|-id=911 bgcolor=#E9E9E9
| 21911 ||  || — || November 14, 1999 || Fountain Hills || C. W. Juels || GEF || align=right | 6.4 km || 
|-id=912 bgcolor=#E9E9E9
| 21912 ||  || — || November 15, 1999 || Fountain Hills || C. W. Juels || EUN || align=right | 5.9 km || 
|-id=913 bgcolor=#E9E9E9
| 21913 Taylorjones ||  ||  || November 3, 1999 || Socorro || LINEAR || — || align=right | 3.6 km || 
|-id=914 bgcolor=#fefefe
| 21914 Melakabinoff ||  ||  || November 3, 1999 || Socorro || LINEAR || — || align=right | 3.7 km || 
|-id=915 bgcolor=#E9E9E9
| 21915 Lavins ||  ||  || November 3, 1999 || Socorro || LINEAR || — || align=right | 4.3 km || 
|-id=916 bgcolor=#fefefe
| 21916 ||  || — || November 3, 1999 || Socorro || LINEAR || V || align=right | 3.2 km || 
|-id=917 bgcolor=#d6d6d6
| 21917 ||  || — || November 3, 1999 || Socorro || LINEAR || — || align=right | 9.4 km || 
|-id=918 bgcolor=#E9E9E9
| 21918 ||  || — || November 4, 1999 || Catalina || CSS || — || align=right | 4.1 km || 
|-id=919 bgcolor=#d6d6d6
| 21919 Luga ||  ||  || November 3, 1999 || Socorro || LINEAR || EOS || align=right | 6.4 km || 
|-id=920 bgcolor=#d6d6d6
| 21920 ||  || — || November 3, 1999 || Socorro || LINEAR || — || align=right | 8.7 km || 
|-id=921 bgcolor=#fefefe
| 21921 Camdenmiller ||  ||  || November 3, 1999 || Socorro || LINEAR || FLO || align=right | 3.6 km || 
|-id=922 bgcolor=#fefefe
| 21922 Mocz ||  ||  || November 3, 1999 || Socorro || LINEAR || — || align=right | 3.7 km || 
|-id=923 bgcolor=#E9E9E9
| 21923 ||  || — || November 3, 1999 || Socorro || LINEAR || EUN || align=right | 8.4 km || 
|-id=924 bgcolor=#E9E9E9
| 21924 Alyssaovaitt ||  ||  || November 4, 1999 || Socorro || LINEAR || — || align=right | 3.3 km || 
|-id=925 bgcolor=#fefefe
| 21925 Supasternak ||  ||  || November 4, 1999 || Socorro || LINEAR || — || align=right | 3.1 km || 
|-id=926 bgcolor=#d6d6d6
| 21926 Jacobperry ||  ||  || November 4, 1999 || Socorro || LINEAR || — || align=right | 7.3 km || 
|-id=927 bgcolor=#d6d6d6
| 21927 Sarahpierz ||  ||  || November 4, 1999 || Socorro || LINEAR || — || align=right | 6.3 km || 
|-id=928 bgcolor=#E9E9E9
| 21928 Prabakaran ||  ||  || November 4, 1999 || Socorro || LINEAR || — || align=right | 5.9 km || 
|-id=929 bgcolor=#E9E9E9
| 21929 Nileshraval ||  ||  || November 4, 1999 || Socorro || LINEAR || — || align=right | 5.2 km || 
|-id=930 bgcolor=#d6d6d6
| 21930 ||  || — || November 4, 1999 || Socorro || LINEAR || SHU3:2 || align=right | 18 km || 
|-id=931 bgcolor=#E9E9E9
| 21931 ||  || — || November 4, 1999 || Socorro || LINEAR || EUN || align=right | 3.8 km || 
|-id=932 bgcolor=#d6d6d6
| 21932 Rios ||  ||  || November 4, 1999 || Socorro || LINEAR || KOR || align=right | 3.8 km || 
|-id=933 bgcolor=#d6d6d6
| 21933 Aaronrozon ||  ||  || November 4, 1999 || Socorro || LINEAR || KOR || align=right | 4.5 km || 
|-id=934 bgcolor=#E9E9E9
| 21934 ||  || — || November 7, 1999 || Xinglong || SCAP || — || align=right | 6.9 km || 
|-id=935 bgcolor=#fefefe
| 21935 ||  || — || November 4, 1999 || Socorro || LINEAR || FLO || align=right | 5.0 km || 
|-id=936 bgcolor=#fefefe
| 21936 Ryan ||  ||  || November 4, 1999 || Socorro || LINEAR || — || align=right | 2.4 km || 
|-id=937 bgcolor=#d6d6d6
| 21937 Basheehan ||  ||  || November 4, 1999 || Socorro || LINEAR || KOR || align=right | 4.1 km || 
|-id=938 bgcolor=#E9E9E9
| 21938 ||  || — || November 4, 1999 || Socorro || LINEAR || — || align=right | 3.2 km || 
|-id=939 bgcolor=#d6d6d6
| 21939 Kasmith ||  ||  || November 4, 1999 || Socorro || LINEAR || KOR || align=right | 3.6 km || 
|-id=940 bgcolor=#E9E9E9
| 21940 ||  || — || November 7, 1999 || Socorro || LINEAR || — || align=right | 3.1 km || 
|-id=941 bgcolor=#E9E9E9
| 21941 ||  || — || November 9, 1999 || Socorro || LINEAR || — || align=right | 3.0 km || 
|-id=942 bgcolor=#E9E9E9
| 21942 Subramanian ||  ||  || November 9, 1999 || Socorro || LINEAR || — || align=right | 5.3 km || 
|-id=943 bgcolor=#fefefe
| 21943 ||  || — || November 9, 1999 || Catalina || CSS || KLI || align=right | 8.9 km || 
|-id=944 bgcolor=#E9E9E9
| 21944 ||  || — || November 9, 1999 || Kitt Peak || Spacewatch || ADE || align=right | 5.7 km || 
|-id=945 bgcolor=#fefefe
| 21945 Kleshchonok ||  ||  || November 13, 1999 || Anderson Mesa || LONEOS || FLO || align=right | 2.7 km || 
|-id=946 bgcolor=#fefefe
| 21946 ||  || — || November 9, 1999 || Catalina || CSS || fast? || align=right | 4.7 km || 
|-id=947 bgcolor=#d6d6d6
| 21947 ||  || — || November 10, 1999 || Kitt Peak || Spacewatch || KOR || align=right | 3.5 km || 
|-id=948 bgcolor=#fefefe
| 21948 ||  || — || November 14, 1999 || Socorro || LINEAR || — || align=right | 1.8 km || 
|-id=949 bgcolor=#E9E9E9
| 21949 Tatulian ||  ||  || November 12, 1999 || Socorro || LINEAR || — || align=right | 3.7 km || 
|-id=950 bgcolor=#d6d6d6
| 21950 ||  || — || November 14, 1999 || Socorro || LINEAR || — || align=right | 9.4 km || 
|-id=951 bgcolor=#d6d6d6
| 21951 ||  || — || November 14, 1999 || Socorro || LINEAR || — || align=right | 9.1 km || 
|-id=952 bgcolor=#fefefe
| 21952 Terry ||  ||  || November 14, 1999 || Socorro || LINEAR || — || align=right | 3.5 km || 
|-id=953 bgcolor=#E9E9E9
| 21953 ||  || — || November 2, 1999 || Catalina || CSS || NEM || align=right | 6.2 km || 
|-id=954 bgcolor=#E9E9E9
| 21954 ||  || — || November 6, 1999 || Socorro || LINEAR || slow || align=right | 8.7 km || 
|-id=955 bgcolor=#E9E9E9
| 21955 ||  || — || November 6, 1999 || Socorro || LINEAR || — || align=right | 4.9 km || 
|-id=956 bgcolor=#E9E9E9
| 21956 Thangada ||  ||  || November 6, 1999 || Socorro || LINEAR || GEF || align=right | 4.2 km || 
|-id=957 bgcolor=#d6d6d6
| 21957 ||  || — || November 6, 1999 || Socorro || LINEAR || — || align=right | 9.1 km || 
|-id=958 bgcolor=#E9E9E9
| 21958 Tripuraneni ||  ||  || November 15, 1999 || Socorro || LINEAR || — || align=right | 4.0 km || 
|-id=959 bgcolor=#d6d6d6
| 21959 ||  || — || November 15, 1999 || Socorro || LINEAR || — || align=right | 14 km || 
|-id=960 bgcolor=#E9E9E9
| 21960 ||  || — || November 15, 1999 || Socorro || LINEAR || — || align=right | 4.2 km || 
|-id=961 bgcolor=#d6d6d6
| 21961 ||  || — || November 8, 1999 || Catalina || CSS || EOS || align=right | 9.0 km || 
|-id=962 bgcolor=#E9E9E9
| 21962 Scottsandford ||  ||  || November 9, 1999 || Anderson Mesa || LONEOS || GEF || align=right | 4.1 km || 
|-id=963 bgcolor=#E9E9E9
| 21963 ||  || — || November 13, 1999 || Catalina || CSS || — || align=right | 10 km || 
|-id=964 bgcolor=#d6d6d6
| 21964 Kevinhousen ||  ||  || November 13, 1999 || Anderson Mesa || LONEOS || — || align=right | 8.0 km || 
|-id=965 bgcolor=#d6d6d6
| 21965 Dones ||  ||  || November 13, 1999 || Anderson Mesa || LONEOS || EOS || align=right | 5.4 km || 
|-id=966 bgcolor=#fefefe
| 21966 Hamadori ||  ||  || November 27, 1999 || Anderson Mesa || LONEOS || — || align=right | 3.1 km || 
|-id=967 bgcolor=#E9E9E9
| 21967 ||  || — || November 30, 1999 || Oizumi || T. Kobayashi || — || align=right | 20 km || 
|-id=968 bgcolor=#E9E9E9
| 21968 ||  || — || November 30, 1999 || Oizumi || T. Kobayashi || — || align=right | 4.7 km || 
|-id=969 bgcolor=#fefefe
| 21969 ||  || — || November 30, 1999 || Kitt Peak || Spacewatch || V || align=right | 2.4 km || 
|-id=970 bgcolor=#fefefe
| 21970 Tyle || 1999 XC ||  || December 1, 1999 || Socorro || LINEAR || FLO || align=right | 3.0 km || 
|-id=971 bgcolor=#E9E9E9
| 21971 || 1999 XG || — || December 1, 1999 || Socorro || LINEAR || ADE || align=right | 8.2 km || 
|-id=972 bgcolor=#E9E9E9
| 21972 || 1999 XU || — || December 2, 1999 || Socorro || LINEAR || — || align=right | 5.0 km || 
|-id=973 bgcolor=#E9E9E9
| 21973 ||  || — || December 2, 1999 || Socorro || LINEAR || — || align=right | 4.0 km || 
|-id=974 bgcolor=#E9E9E9
| 21974 ||  || — || December 3, 1999 || Fountain Hills || C. W. Juels || — || align=right | 5.2 km || 
|-id=975 bgcolor=#fefefe
| 21975 ||  || — || December 4, 1999 || Fountain Hills || C. W. Juels || FLO || align=right | 3.0 km || 
|-id=976 bgcolor=#fefefe
| 21976 ||  || — || December 4, 1999 || Fountain Hills || C. W. Juels || — || align=right | 6.0 km || 
|-id=977 bgcolor=#E9E9E9
| 21977 ||  || — || December 4, 1999 || Fountain Hills || C. W. Juels || — || align=right | 5.4 km || 
|-id=978 bgcolor=#d6d6d6
| 21978 ||  || — || December 4, 1999 || Catalina || CSS || — || align=right | 7.3 km || 
|-id=979 bgcolor=#E9E9E9
| 21979 ||  || — || December 4, 1999 || Catalina || CSS || — || align=right | 4.0 km || 
|-id=980 bgcolor=#d6d6d6
| 21980 ||  || — || December 4, 1999 || Catalina || CSS || — || align=right | 3.6 km || 
|-id=981 bgcolor=#E9E9E9
| 21981 ||  || — || December 4, 1999 || Catalina || CSS || MRX || align=right | 5.4 km || 
|-id=982 bgcolor=#fefefe
| 21982 ||  || — || December 4, 1999 || Gekko || T. Kagawa || fast? || align=right | 6.4 km || 
|-id=983 bgcolor=#E9E9E9
| 21983 ||  || — || December 6, 1999 || Catalina || CSS || EUN || align=right | 4.9 km || 
|-id=984 bgcolor=#d6d6d6
| 21984 ||  || — || December 6, 1999 || Catalina || CSS || — || align=right | 10 km || 
|-id=985 bgcolor=#d6d6d6
| 21985 Šejna ||  ||  || December 2, 1999 || Ondřejov || L. Kotková || THM || align=right | 6.9 km || 
|-id=986 bgcolor=#fefefe
| 21986 Alexanduribe ||  ||  || December 2, 1999 || Socorro || LINEAR || V || align=right | 3.1 km || 
|-id=987 bgcolor=#E9E9E9
| 21987 ||  || — || December 3, 1999 || Socorro || LINEAR || — || align=right | 3.4 km || 
|-id=988 bgcolor=#d6d6d6
| 21988 ||  || — || December 5, 1999 || Socorro || LINEAR || — || align=right | 8.0 km || 
|-id=989 bgcolor=#d6d6d6
| 21989 Werntz ||  ||  || December 5, 1999 || Socorro || LINEAR || — || align=right | 4.1 km || 
|-id=990 bgcolor=#d6d6d6
| 21990 Garretyazzie ||  ||  || December 6, 1999 || Socorro || LINEAR || KOR || align=right | 4.8 km || 
|-id=991 bgcolor=#d6d6d6
| 21991 Zane ||  ||  || December 6, 1999 || Socorro || LINEAR || KOR || align=right | 4.0 km || 
|-id=992 bgcolor=#fefefe
| 21992 ||  || — || December 6, 1999 || Socorro || LINEAR || — || align=right | 3.7 km || 
|-id=993 bgcolor=#d6d6d6
| 21993 ||  || — || December 6, 1999 || Socorro || LINEAR || KOR || align=right | 4.3 km || 
|-id=994 bgcolor=#fefefe
| 21994 ||  || — || December 6, 1999 || Socorro || LINEAR || — || align=right | 2.1 km || 
|-id=995 bgcolor=#E9E9E9
| 21995 ||  || — || December 6, 1999 || Socorro || LINEAR || — || align=right | 4.2 km || 
|-id=996 bgcolor=#E9E9E9
| 21996 ||  || — || December 6, 1999 || Socorro || LINEAR || MAR || align=right | 6.8 km || 
|-id=997 bgcolor=#E9E9E9
| 21997 ||  || — || December 7, 1999 || Fountain Hills || C. W. Juels || — || align=right | 6.0 km || 
|-id=998 bgcolor=#E9E9E9
| 21998 ||  || — || December 7, 1999 || Fountain Hills || C. W. Juels || MAR || align=right | 5.5 km || 
|-id=999 bgcolor=#E9E9E9
| 21999 Disora ||  ||  || December 7, 1999 || Campo Catino || F. Mallia || EUN || align=right | 5.5 km || 
|-id=000 bgcolor=#d6d6d6
| 22000 ||  || — || December 7, 1999 || Socorro || LINEAR || — || align=right | 9.8 km || 
|}

References

External links 
 Discovery Circumstances: Numbered Minor Planets (20001)–(25000) (IAU Minor Planet Center)

0021